= Polish–Lithuanian Commonwealth =

Aristocratic republic in Europe (1569–1795)

Coordinates: 50°03′14″N 19°56′05″E

Kingdom of Poland and the Grand Duchy of Lithuania: Królestwo Polskie i Wielkie Księstwo Litewskie (Polish); Regnum Poloniae Magnusque Ducatus Lithuaniae (Latin)
- 1569–1795
- Royal banner (c. 1587 – 1668) House of Vasa (c. 1587 – 1668)
- Motto: Si Deus nobiscum quis contra nos; "If God is with us, then who is against us"; Pro Fide, Lege et Rege; "For faith, law and king"
- Anthem: Gaude Mater Polonia; "Rejoice, oh Mother Poland"
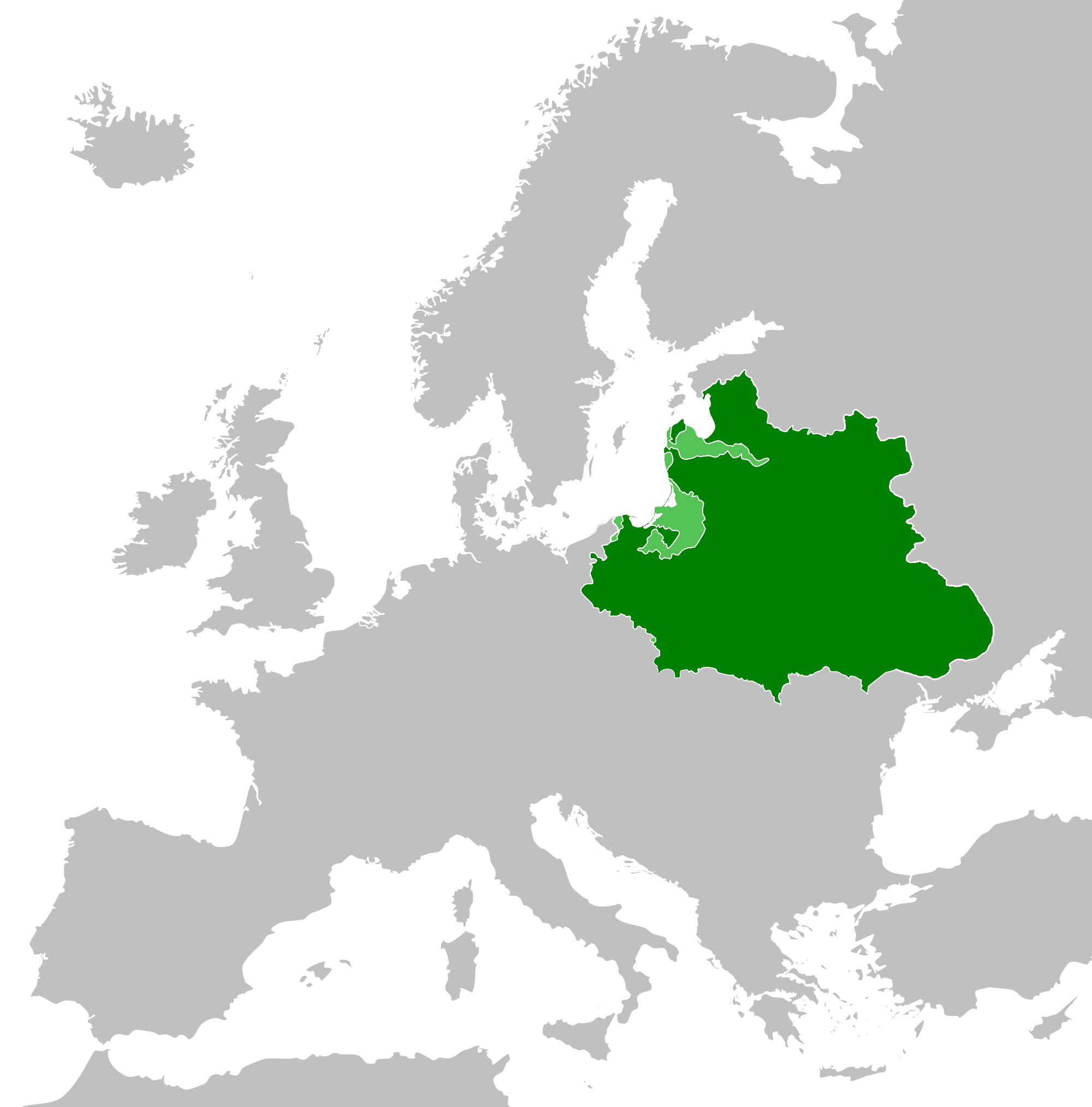
- Capital: Kraków (1569–1596); Warsaw (1596–1795)
- Official languages: Polish; Latin
- Common languages: Ruthenian; German; Lithuanian; (see § Languages)
- Ethnic groups: see § Demographics
- Religion: Catholicism (official); Eastern Orthodoxy; Protestantism; Judaism; Islam
- Demonym: Polish or Lithuanian
- Government: Noble's democracy with an elected monarch (Note: Hereditary monarchy until 1572 and briefly Constitutional between 1791 and 1792)
- King and Grand Duke
  - 1569–1572 (first): Sigismund II Augustus
  - 1764–1795 (last): Stanisław II August
- Grand Chancellor of the Crown
  - 1569–1576 (first): Walenty Dembiński
  - 1793–1795 (last): Antoni Sułkowski
- Grand Chancellor of Lithuania
  - 1569–1584 (first): Mikołaj Radziwiłł
  - 1793–1795 (last): Joachim Chreptowicz
- Legislature: General sejm
  - Upper house: Senate
  - Lower house: Chamber of Deputies
- Historical era: Early modern period
  - Union of Lublin: 1 July 1569
  - First Partition: 5 August 1772
  - 3 May Constitution: 3 May 1791
  - Second Partition: 23 January 1793
  - Third Partition: 24 October 1795

Area
- 1582: 815,000 km^{2} (315,000 sq mi)
- 1618: 1,000,000 km^{2} (390,000 sq mi)
- 1700: 733,500 km^{2} (283,200 sq mi)

Population
  - 1582: 8,000,000
  - 1700: 8,000,000
Preceded by
Kingdom of Poland
Grand Duchy of Lithuania
Succeeded by
Kingdom of Galicia and Lodomeria
Russian Empire
Kingdom of Prussia

The Polish–Lithuanian Commonwealth, (Note: Polish: Rzeczpospolita Obojga Narodów; Latin: Res Publica Utriusque Nationis; Lithuanian: Abiejų Tautų Respublika, Žečpospolita; German: Republik beider Nationen, Republik beider Völker, Republik Polen–Litauen; Ukrainian: Річ Посполита, romanized: Rich Pospolyta; Belarusian: Рэч Паспалітая, romanized: Rech Paspalitaya; Ruthenian: Рѣчъ Посполита) (Note: then formally titled the "Kingdom of Poland and the Grand Duchy of Lithuania": Polish: Królestwo Polskie i Wielkie Księstwo Litewskie; Latin: Regnum Poloniae Magnusque Ducatus Lithuaniae; Lithuanian: Lenkijos Karalystė ir Lietuvos Didžioji Kunigaikštystė; German: Königreich Polen und des Großfürstentums Litauen; Ukrainian: Королівство Польське і Велике князівство Литовське; Belarusian: Польскае Каралеўства і Вялікае Княства Літоўскае) also referred to as Poland–Lithuania or the First Polish Republic (Polish: I Rzeczpospolita), (Note: a historiographic term, with the full form in Polish: I Rzeczpospolita Polska) was a federative real union between the Kingdom of Poland and the Grand Duchy of Lithuania, existing from 1569 to 1795. This state was among the largest, most populated countries of 16th- to 18th-century Europe. At its peak in the early 17th century, the Commonwealth spanned approximately 1,000,000 km^{2} (390,000 sq mi) and supported a multi-ethnic population of around 12 million as of 1618. The official languages of the Commonwealth were Polish and Latin, with Catholicism as the state religion.

The Union of Lublin established the Commonwealth as a single entity on 1 July 1569. The two nations had previously been in a personal union since the Krewo Agreement of 1385 (Polish–Lithuanian union) and the subsequent marriage of Queen Jadwiga of Poland to Grand Duke Jogaila of Lithuania, who was crowned as Władysław II Jagiełło, jure uxoris King of Poland. Their descendant, Sigismund II Augustus, enforced the merger to strengthen frontiers of his dominion and maintain unity. As he remained childless, his death in 1572 marked the end of the Jagiellonian dynasty. It introduced an elective monarchy, whereupon members of domestic noble families or external dynasties were elected to the throne for life.

The Commonwealth's parliamentary system of government and elective monarchy, called the Golden Liberty, was an early example of constitutional monarchy. The General Sejm, the bicameral Parliament, held legislative power; its lower house was elected by szlachta nobles comprising some 10% of the population. A constitutional statute, the Henrician Articles, bound the king and his government and tightly circumscribed royal authority. The country also exhibited unusual levels of ethnic diversity and great religious tolerance by European standards, guaranteed by the Warsaw Confederation Act of 1573, (Note: This quality of the Commonwealth was recognized by its contemporaries. Robert Burton, in his The Anatomy of Melancholy, first published in 1621, writes of Poland: "Poland is a receptacle of all religions, where Samosetans, Socinians, Photinians ..., Arians, Anabaptists are to be found"; "In Europe, Poland and Amsterdam are the common sanctuaries [for Jews]".) though the practical degree of religious freedom varied. Poland acted as the dominant partner in the union. Polonization of nobles was generally voluntary, but state efforts at religious conversion were sometimes resisted.

After a long period of prosperity, the Commonwealth found itself under sustained, combined assault from its neighbours and entered a period of protracted political and military decline. Its growing weakness led to its partitioning among its neighbours, Austria, Prussia, and Russia, during the late 18th century. Shortly before its demise, the Commonwealth adopted a major reform effort and enacted the 3 May Constitution, which was the first modern codified constitution in European history and the second in world history after the United States Constitution.

== Name ==
The official name of the state was the Kingdom of Poland and the Grand Duchy of Lithuania (Polish: Królestwo Polskie i Wielkie Księstwo Litewskie, Latin: Regnum Poloniae Magnusque Ducatus Lithuaniae). The Latin term was usually employed in international treaties and diplomacy. By concluding the 1569 Union of Lublin the Grand Duchy of Lithuania remained a separate state from the Crown of the Kingdom of Poland with its own name, laws, and territory. The name 'Commonwealth of Two Nations' (Polish: Rzeczpospolita Obojga Narodów) came into force during the reign of Stephen Báthory (since 1582 and was officially used until 1795). On 28 January 1588, Sigismund III Vasa confirmed the Third Statute of Lithuania in which it was stated that the Polish–Lithuanian Commonwealth is a federation of two countries – the Grand Duchy of Lithuania and the Kingdom of Poland where both countries have equal rights within it.

In the 17th century and later it was also known as the 'Most Serene Commonwealth of Poland' (Polish: Najjaśniejsza Rzeczpospolita Polska, Latin: Serenissima Res Publica Poloniae), the Commonwealth of the Polish Kingdom, or the Commonwealth of Poland.

Western Europeans often simplified the name to 'Poland' and in many past and some modern sources it is referred to as the Kingdom of Poland, or just Poland. The terms 'Commonwealth of Poland' and 'Commonwealth of Two Nations' (Polish: Rzeczpospolita Obojga Narodów, Latin: Res Publica Utriusque Nationis) were used in the Reciprocal Guarantee of Two Nations (1791). In the preamble of the Reciprocal Guarantee of Two Nations (1791) the dualistic nature of the state was confirmed and separate monarchial titles of Stanisław August Poniatowski were included: King of Poland (Polish: Krol Polski) and Grand Duke of Lithuania (Polish: Wielki xiązę litewski), also the land envoys of the Polish Crown and the Grand Duchy of Lithuania (Polish: posłów ziemskich Korony Polskiey, y Wielkiego Xięstwa Litewskiego) were mentioned. The English term Polish–Lithuanian Commonwealth and German Polen–Litauen are seen as renderings of the 'Commonwealth of Two Nations' variant.

Other informal names include the 'Republic of Nobles' (Polish: Rzeczpospolita szlachecka) and the 'First Polish Republic' (Polish: I Rzeczpospolita), the latter is relatively common in historiography to distinguish it from the Second Polish Republic. In Lithuania, the state is referred to as 'Republic of Both Nations' (Lithuanian: Abiejų Tautų Respublika).

== History ==
=== Prelude (1370–1569) ===
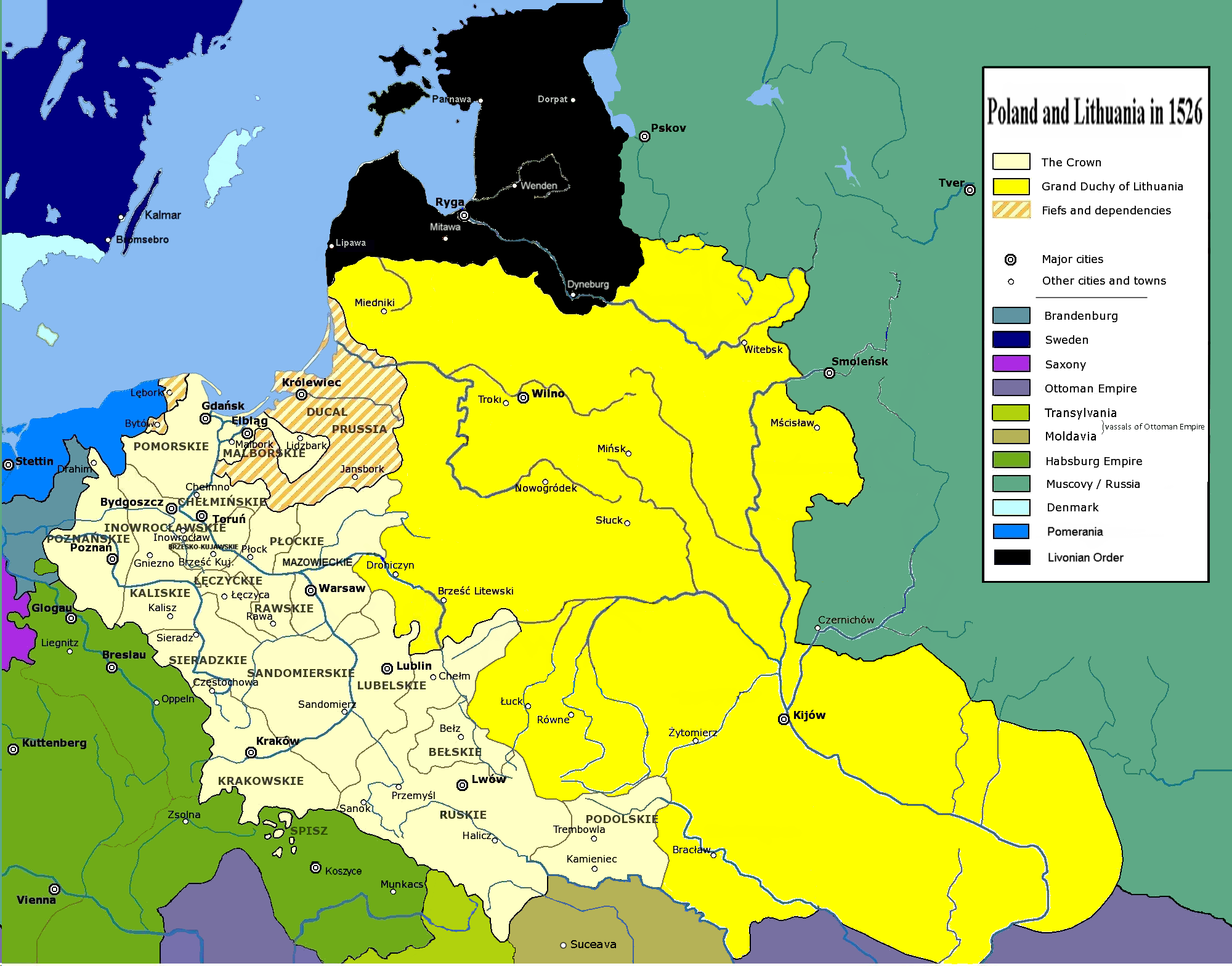
The Kingdom of Poland and the Grand Duchy of Lithuania in 1526.

The Kingdom of Poland and the Grand Duchy of Lithuania underwent an alternating series of wars and alliances across the 13th and 14th centuries. The relations between the two states differed at times as each strove and competed for political, economic or military dominance of the region. In turn, Poland remained a staunch ally of its southern neighbour, Hungary. The last Polish monarch from the native Piast dynasty, Casimir the Great, died on 5 November 1370 without fathering a legitimate male heir. Consequently, the crown passed onto his Hungarian nephew, Louis of Anjou, who ruled the Kingdom of Hungary in a personal union with Poland. A fundamental step in developing extensive ties with Lithuania was a succession crisis arising in the 1380s. Louis died on 10 September 1382 and, like his uncle, did not produce a son to succeed him. His two daughters, Mary and Jadwiga (Hedwig), held claims to the vast dual realm.

The Polish lords rejected Mary in favour of her younger sister Jadwiga, partly due to Mary's association with Sigismund of Luxembourg. The future queen regnant was betrothed to young William Habsburg, Duke of Austria; but certain factions of the nobility remained apprehensive, believing that William would not secure domestic interests. Instead, they turned to Jogaila, the Grand Duke of Lithuania. Jogaila was a lifelong pagan and vowed to adopt Catholicism upon marriage by signing the Union of Krewo on 14 August 1385. The Act imposed Christianity in Lithuania and transformed Poland into a diarchy, a kingdom ruled over by two sovereigns; their descendants and successive monarchs held the titles of king and grand duke respectively. The ultimate clause dictated that Lithuania was to be merged in perpetuity (perpetuo applicare) with the Polish Kingdom; however, this did not take effect until 1569. Jogaila was crowned as Władysław II Jagiełło at Wawel Cathedral on 4 March 1386.

=== Union of Lublin (1569) ===
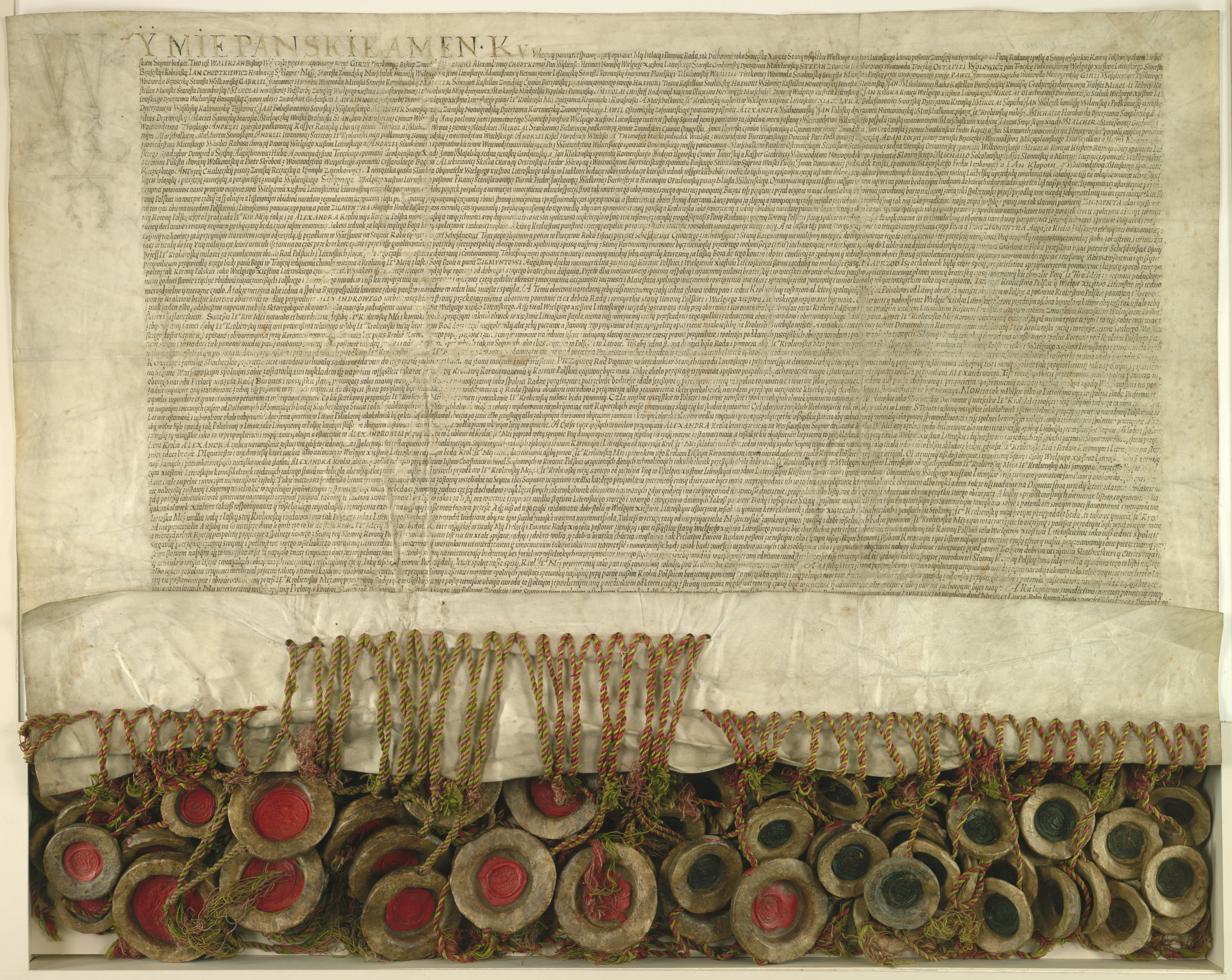
The Union of Lublin joined the Kingdom of Poland and the Grand Duchy of Lithuania in 1569.

Several minor agreements were struck before unification, notably the Union of Kraków and Vilnius, the Union of Vilnius and Radom and the Union of Grodno. Lithuania's vulnerable position and rising tensions on its eastern flank persuaded the nobles to seek a closer bond with Poland. The idea of a federation presented better economic opportunities, whilst securing Lithuania's borders from hostile states to the north, south and east. Lesser Lithuanian nobility were eager to share the personal privileges and political liberties enjoyed by the Polish szlachta, but did not accept Polish demands for the incorporation of the Grand Duchy into Poland as a mere province, with no sense of autonomy. Mikołaj "the Red" Radziwiłł (Radvila Rudasis) and his cousin Mikołaj "the Black" Radziwiłł, two prominent nobles and military commanders in Lithuania, vocally opposed the union.

The ruler of the two countries, Sigismund II Augustus, who was childless and ailing, was a fierce proponent of a single unified Commonwealth. According to historians, it was his active involvement which hastened the process and made the union possible. A parliament (sejm) convened on 10 January 1569 in the city of Lublin, attended by envoys from both nations. It was agreed that the merger would take place the same year and both parliaments will be fused into a joint assembly. No independent parliamentary convocation or diet was henceforth permitted. Subjects of the Polish Crown were no longer restricted in purchasing land on Lithuanian territory and a single currency was established. Whilst the military remained separate, a unified foreign policy meant that Lithuanian troops were obliged to contribute during a conflict not to their advantage. As a result, several Lithuanian magnates deplored the accords and left the assembly in protest. Sigismund II used his authority as grand duke and enforced the Act of Union in contumaciam. In fear, the absent nobles promptly returned to the negotiations. The Union of Lublin was passed by the gathered deputies and signed by attendees on 1 July, thus creating the Polish–Lithuanian Commonwealth.

Sigismund's death in 1572 was followed by an interregnum during which adjustments were made to the constitutional system; these adjustments significantly increased the power of the Polish nobility and established a truly elective monarchy.

=== Apex and the Golden Age (1573–1648) ===
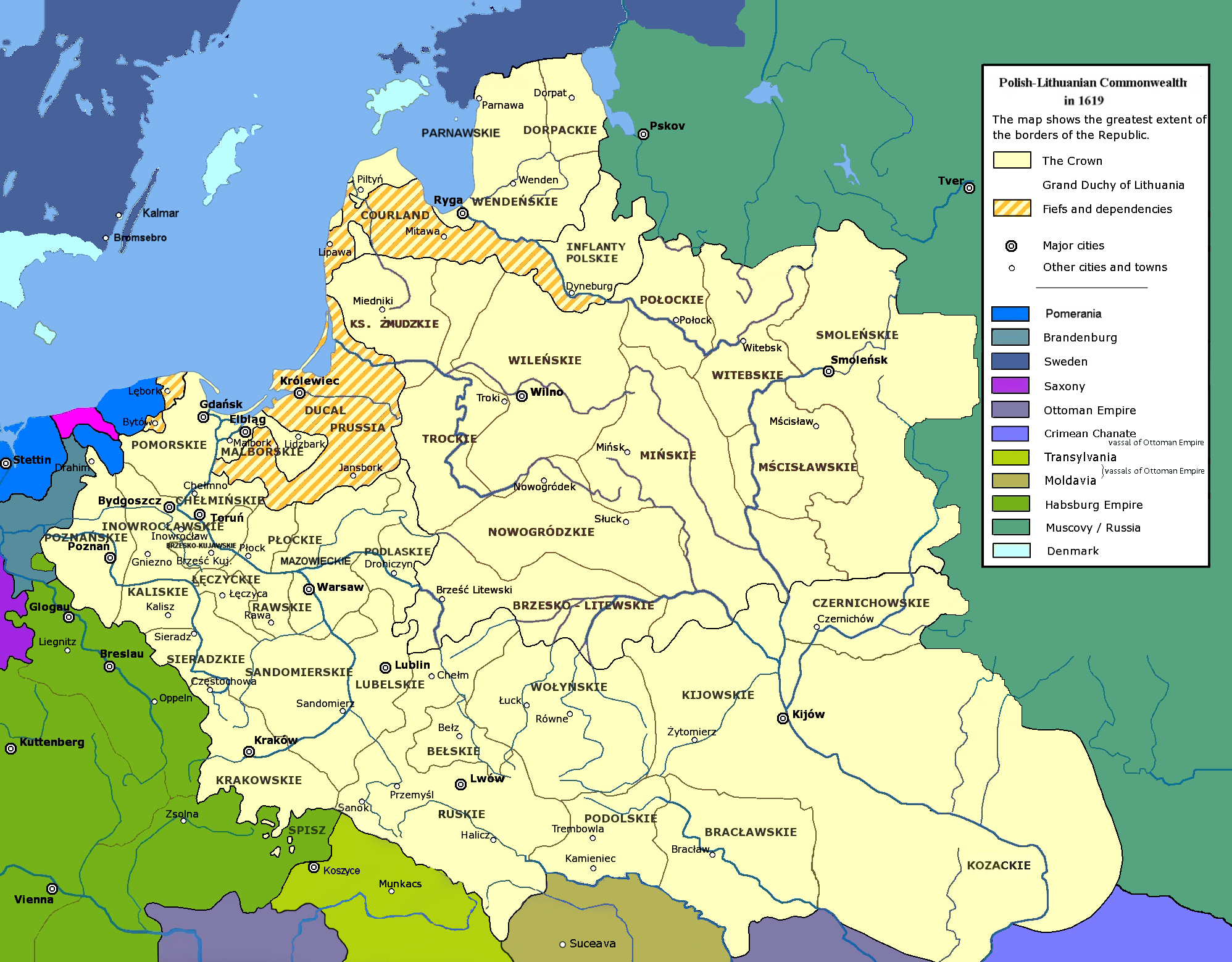
The Polish–Lithuanian Commonwealth at its greatest extent in 1619.

On 11 May 1573, Henry de Valois, son of Henry II of France and Catherine de' Medici, was proclaimed King of Poland and Grand Duke of Lithuania in the first royal election outside Warsaw. Approximately 40,000 nobles cast a vote in what was to become a centuries-long tradition of a nobles' democracy (Golden Liberty). Henry already emerged as a candidate before Sigismund's death and received widespread support from the pro-French factions. The choice was a political move aimed at curtailing Habsburg hegemony, ending skirmishes with the French-allied Ottomans, and profiting from the lucrative trade with France. It was also believed that an Austrian Archduke could be too powerful and attempt to limit noble privileges. French envoys had also offered large amounts of bribes, amounting to several hundred thousand ecus. Upon ascending the throne, Henry signed the contractual agreement known as the Pacta conventa and approbated the Henrician Articles. The Act stated the fundamental principles of governance and constitutional law in the Polish–Lithuanian Commonwealth. In June 1574, Henry abandoned Poland and headed back to claim the French crown following the death of his brother and predecessor, Charles IX. The throne was subsequently declared vacant.

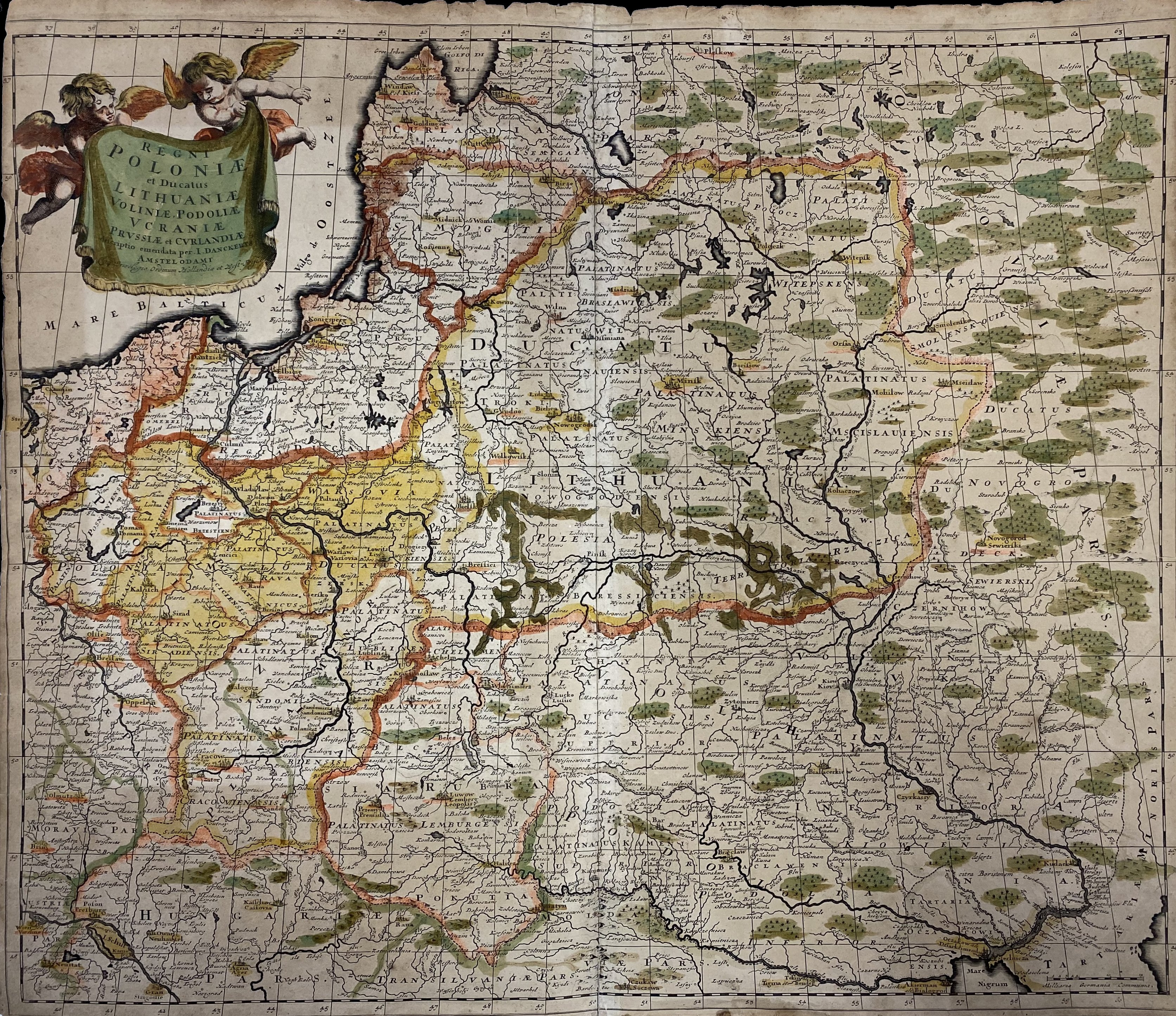
17th century map of the Polish–Lithuanian Commonwealth by Justus Danckerts

The interregnum concluded on 12 December 1575 when primate Jakub Uchański declared Maximilian II, Holy Roman Emperor, as the next king. The decision was condemned by the anti-Habsburg coalition, which demanded a "native" candidate, known as "Piasts". As a compromise, on 13 December 1575 Anna Jagiellon – sister of Sigismund Augustus and a member of the Jagiellonian dynasty – became the new monarch. The nobles simultaneously elected Stephen Báthory as co-regent, who ruled jure uxoris. Báthory's election proved controversial – Lithuania and Ducal Prussia initially refused to recognise the Transylvanian as their ruler. Piotr Zborowski supported Bathory as he wanted to promote a princely or ducal candidate. He also endorsed the Duke of Ferrara. The wealthy port city of Gdańsk (Danzig) staged a revolt, and, with the help of Denmark, blockaded maritime trade to neutral Elbląg (Elbing). Báthory, unable to penetrate the city's extensive fortifications, succumbed to the demands for greater privileges and freedoms. However, his successful Livonian campaign ended in the annexation of Livonia and the Duchy of Courland and Semigallia (modern-day Estonia and Latvia, respectively), thus expanding the Commonwealth's influence into the Baltics. Most importantly, Poland gained the Hanseatic city of Riga on the Baltic Sea.

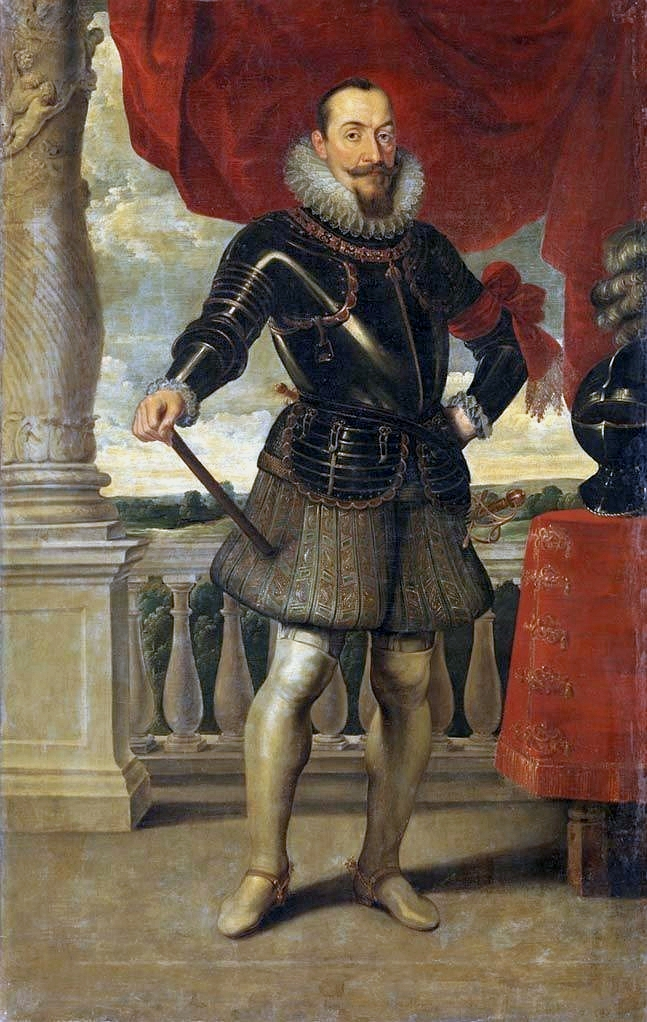
Sigismund III Vasa, who reigned between 1587 and 1632, presided over an era of prosperity and territorial expansion of the Commonwealth.

In 1587, Sigismund III Vasa – the son of John III of Sweden and Catherine Jagiellon – won the election, but his claim was overtly contested by Maximilian III of Austria, who launched a military expedition to challenge the new king. His defeat in 1588 at the hands of Jan Zamoyski sealed Sigismund's right to the throne of Poland and Sweden. Sigismund's long reign marked an end to the Polish Golden Age and the beginning of the Silver Age. A devout Catholic, he hoped to restore absolutism and imposed Roman Catholicism during the height of the Counter-Reformation. His intolerance towards the Protestants in Sweden sparked a war of independence, which ended the Polish–Swedish union. As a consequence, he was deposed in Sweden by his uncle Charles IX Vasa. In Poland, the Zebrzydowski rebellion was brutally suppressed.

Sigismund III then initiated a policy of expansionism, and invaded Russia in 1609 when that country was plagued by a civil war known as the Time of Troubles. In July 1610, the outnumbered Polish force comprising winged hussars defeated the Russian empire at the Battle of Klushino, which enabled the Poles to take and occupy Moscow for the next two years. The disgraced Vasili IV of Russia was transported in a cage to Warsaw where he paid a tribute to Sigismund; Vasili was later murdered in captivity. The Commonwealth forces were eventually driven out on 4 November 1612 (celebrated as Unity Day in Russia). The war concluded with a truce that granted Poland–Lithuania extensive territories in the east and marked its largest territorial expansion. At least five million Russians died between 1598 and 1613, the result of continuous conflict, famine and Sigismund's invasion.

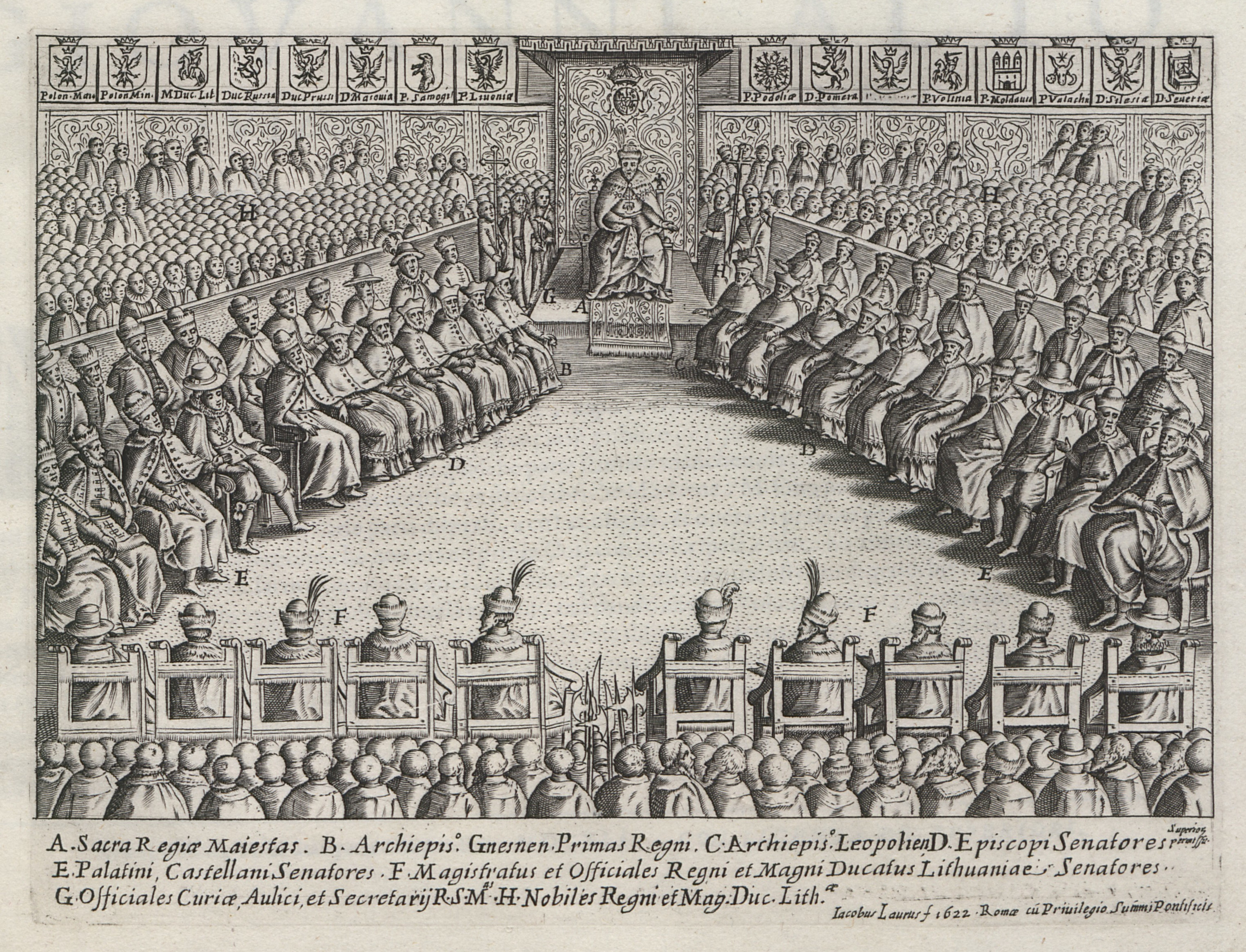
Sejm (parliament) of the Polish–Lithuanian Commonwealth in the early 17th century

The Polish–Ottoman War (1620–21) forced Poland to withdraw from Moldavia in southeastern Europe, but Sigismund's victory over the Turks at Khotyn diminished the supremacy of the Sultanate and eventually led to the murder of Osman II. This secured the Turkish frontier for the duration of Sigismund's rule. In spite of the victories in the Polish–Swedish War (1626–1629), the exhausted Commonwealth army signed the Treaty of Altmark which ceded much of Livonia to Sweden under Gustavus Adolphus. At the same time, the country's powerful parliament was dominated by nobles (Pic. 2) who were reluctant to get involved in the Thirty Years' War; this neutrality spared the country from the ravages of a political-religious conflict that devastated most of contemporary Europe.

During this period, Poland was experiencing a cultural awakening and extensive developments in arts and architecture; the first Vasa king openly sponsored foreign painters, craftsmen, musicians and engineers, who settled in the Commonwealth at his request.

Sigismund's eldest son, Ladislaus succeeded him as Władysław IV in 1632 with no major opposition. A skilled tactician, he invested in artillery, modernised the army, and fiercely defended the Commonwealth's eastern borders. Under the Treaty of Stuhmsdorf, he reclaimed regions of Livonia and the Baltics which were lost during the Polish-Swedish wars. Unlike his father who worshipped the Habsburgs, Władysław sought closer ties with France and married Marie Louise Gonzaga, daughter of Charles I Gonzaga, Duke of Mantua, in 1646.

=== Deluge, rebellions and Vienna (1648–1696) ===
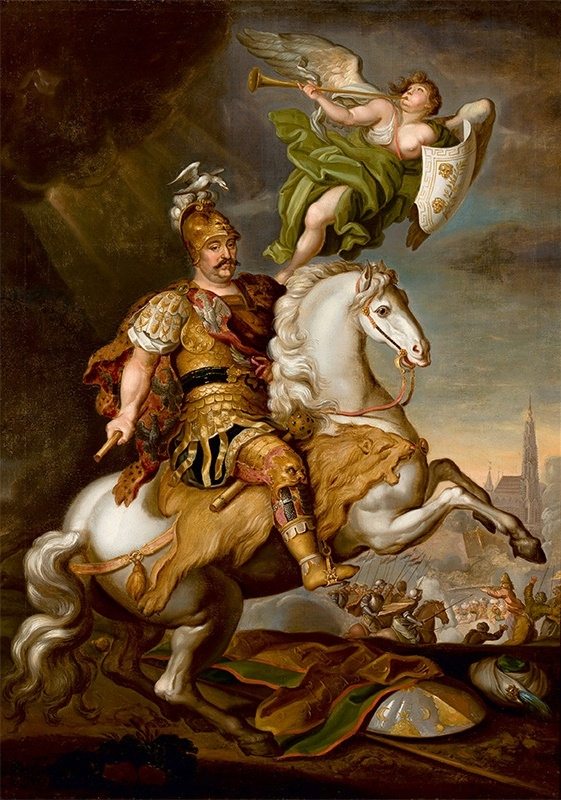
John III Sobieski, victor over the Ottoman Turks at the Battle of Vienna in 1683.

The Commonwealth's power and stability began waning after a series of blows during the following decades. Władysław's brother, John II Casimir, proved to be weak and impotent. The multicultural and mega-diverse federation already suffered domestic problems. As persecution of religious and ethnic minorities strengthened, several groups started to rebel.

A major rebellion of self-governed Ukrainian Cossacks inhabiting the south-eastern borderlands of the Commonwealth rebelled against Polish and Catholic oppression of Orthodox Ukraine in 1648, in what came to be known as the Khmelnytsky Uprising. It resulted in a Ukrainian request, under the terms of the Treaty of Pereyaslav, for protection by the Russian Tsar. In 1651, in the face of a growing threat from Poland, and forsaken by his Tatar allies, Khmelnytsky asked the Tsar to incorporate Ukraine as an autonomous duchy under Russian protection. Russian annexation of Zaporizhian Ukraine gradually supplanted Polish influence in that part of Europe. In the years following, Polish settlers, nobles, Catholics and Jews became the victims of retaliation massacres instigated by the Cossacks in their dominions.

The other blow to the Commonwealth was a Swedish invasion in 1655, known as the Deluge, which was supported by troops of Transylvanian Duke George II Rákóczi and Frederick William, Elector of Brandenburg. Under the Treaty of Bromberg in 1657, Catholic Poland was forced to renounce its suzerainty over Protestant Prussia; in 1701 the once-insignificant duchy was transformed into the Kingdom of Prussia, which became a major European power in the 18th century and proved to be Poland's most enduring foe.

In the late 17th century, the king of the weakened Commonwealth, John III Sobieski, allied with Holy Roman Emperor Leopold I to deal crushing defeats to the Ottoman Empire. In 1683, the Battle of Vienna marked the final turning point in the 250-year struggle between the forces of Christian Europe and the Islamic Ottomans. For its centuries-long opposition to Muslim advances, the Commonwealth would gain the name of Antemurale Christianitatis (bulwark of Christianity). During the next 16 years, the Great Turkish War would drive the Turks permanently south of the Danube River, never again to threaten central Europe.

=== Political turmoil and the enlightenment (1697–1771) ===
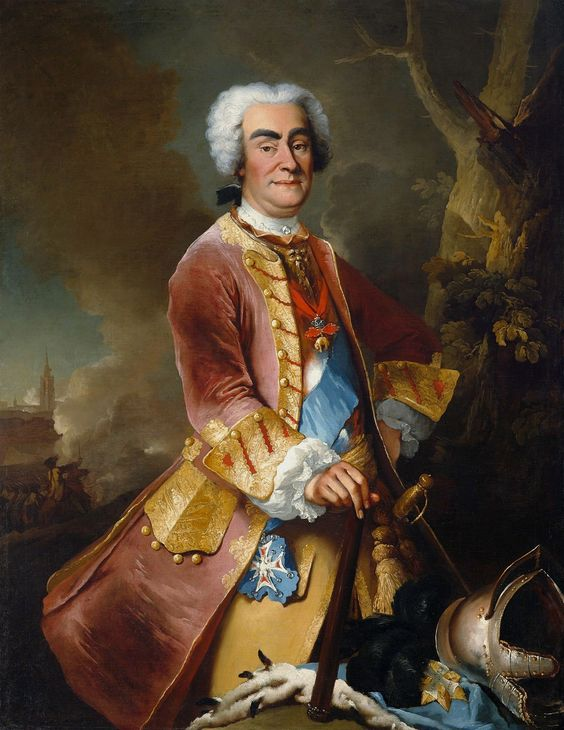
Augustus II the Strong, King of Poland and Elector of Saxony, wearing the Order of the White Eagle which he established in 1705.

John Sobieski's death in 1696 arguably ended the period of national sovereignty, and Poland's relative authority over the region dwindled swiftly. By the 18th century, destabilization of its political system brought the Commonwealth to the brink of civil war and the state became increasingly susceptible to foreign influence. The remaining European powers perpetually meddled in the country's affairs. Upon the death of a king, several royal houses actively intruded in the hope of securing votes for their desired candidates. The practice was common and apparent, and the selection was often the result of hefty bribes directed at corrupt nobles. Louis XIV of France heavily invested in François Louis, Prince of Conti, in opposition to James Louis Sobieski, Maximilian Emanuel of Bavaria and Frederick Augustus of Saxony. The latter's conversion from Lutheranism to Catholicism awed the conservative magnates and Pope Innocent XII, who in turn voiced their endorsement. Imperial Russia and Habsburg Austria also contributed by financing Frederick, whose election took place in June 1697. Many questioned the legality of his elevation to the throne; it was speculated that the Prince of Conti had received more votes and was the rightful heir. Frederick hurried with his armies to Poland to quell any opposition. He was crowned as Augustus II in September and Conti's brief military engagement near Gdańsk in November of the same year proved fruitless.

The House of Wettin ruled Poland–Lithuania and Saxony simultaneously, dividing power between the two states. In spite of his controversial means of attaining power, Augustus II lavishly spent on the arts and left an extensive cultural and architectural (Baroque) legacy in both countries. In Poland, he expanded Wilanów and facilitated the refurbishment of the Warsaw Royal Castle into a modern palatial residence. Countless landmarks and monuments in the city bear names referencing the Saxon kings, notably Saxon Garden, Saxon Axis and the former Saxon Palace. The period saw the development of urban planning, street allocation, hospitals, schools (Collegium Nobilium), public parks and libraries (Załuski Library). The first manufactories producing on a mass scale were opened to satisfy the demands of the nobility as consumers.

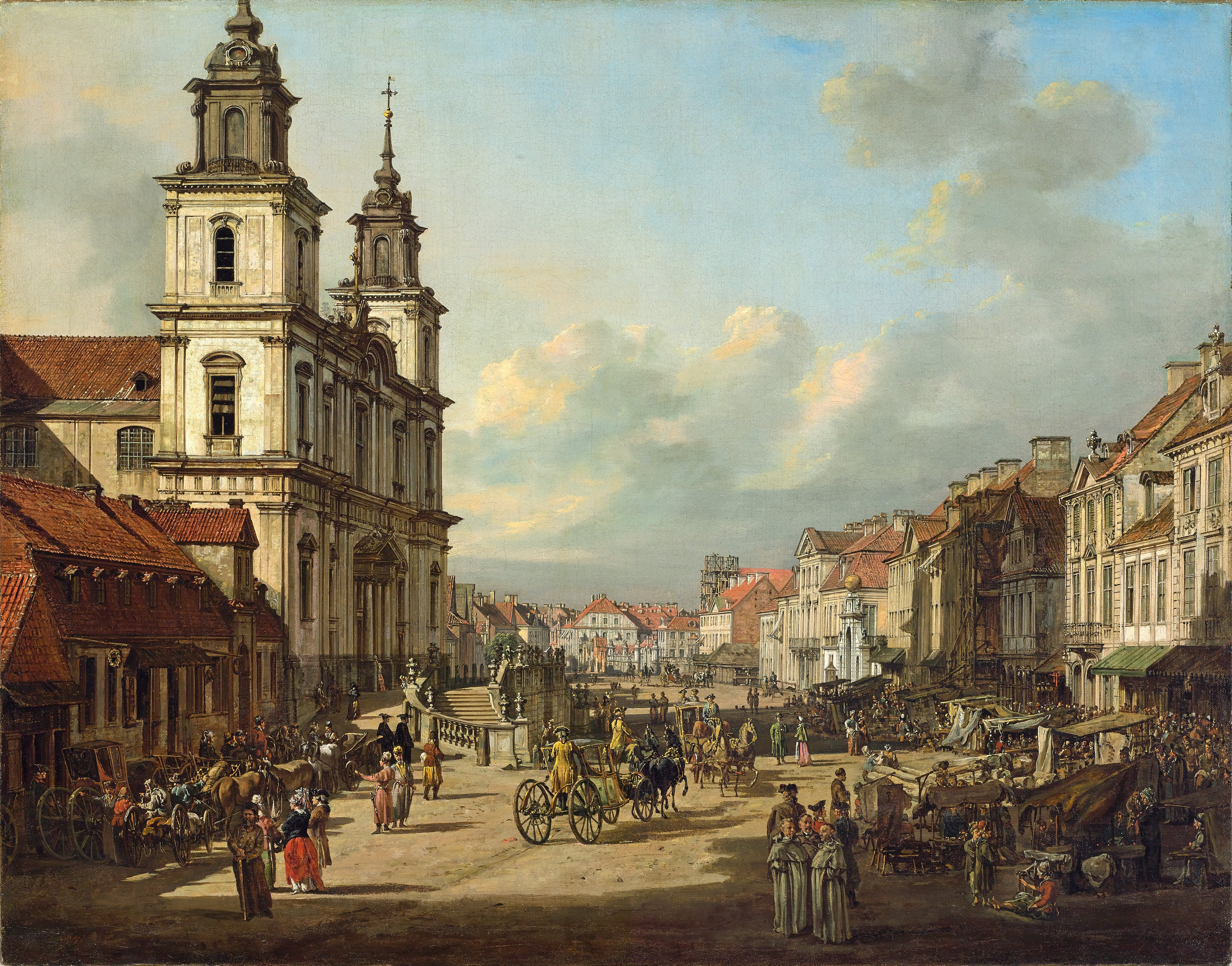
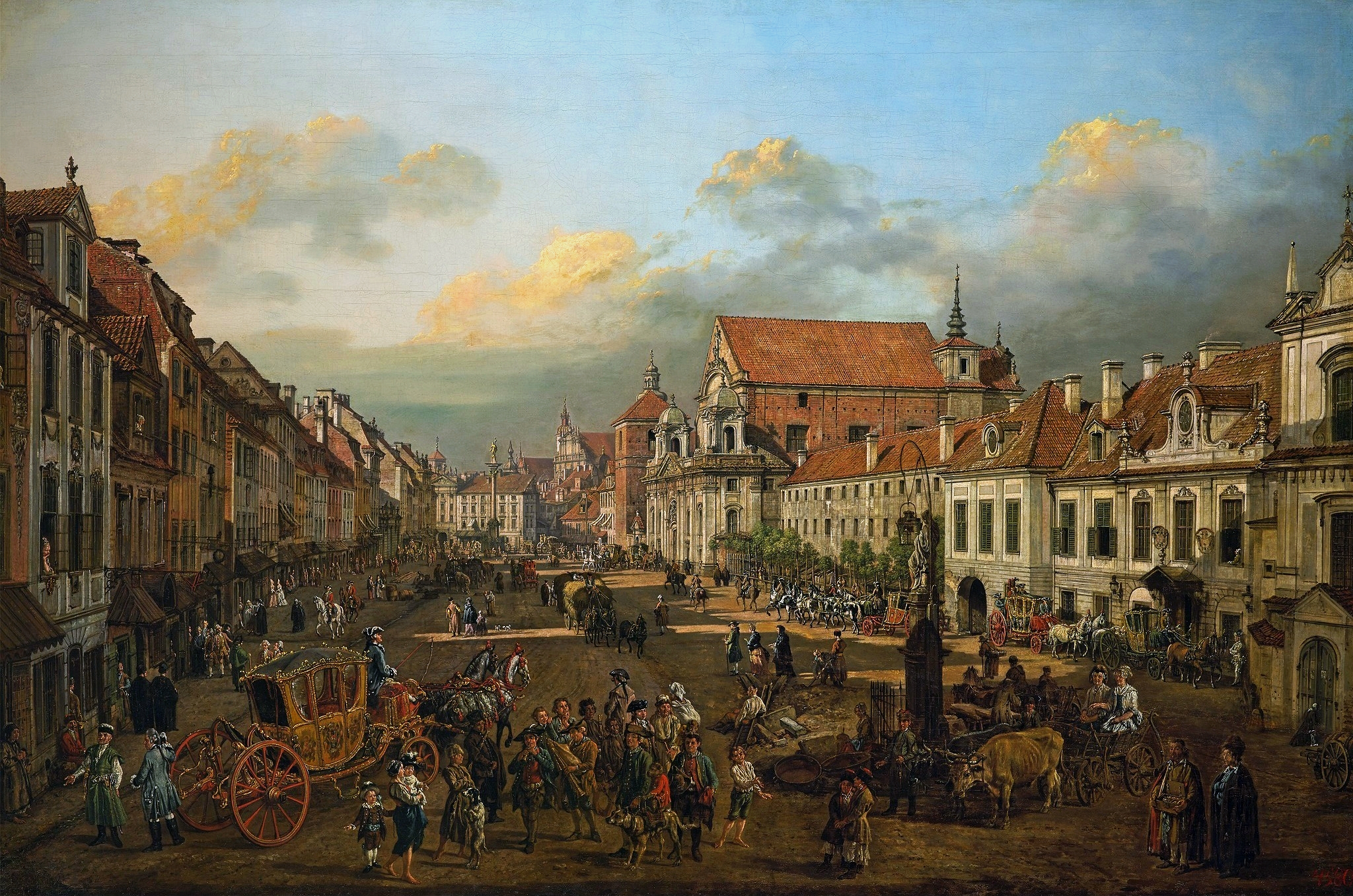
Warsaw near the end of the Commonwealth's existence. Paintings by Bernardo Bellotto, 1770s

At the height of the Great Northern War, a coalition (Warsaw Confederation) against Augustus II was formed by Stanisław Leszczyński and other magnates sponsored by Sweden. The Polish–Lithuanian Commonwealth was formally neutral at this point, as Augustus entered the war as Elector of Saxony. Disregarding Polish negotiation proposals supported by the Swedish parliament, Charles crossed into the Commonwealth and vanquished the Saxe-Polish forces at the Battle of Kliszów in 1702 and at the Battle of Pułtusk in 1703. Charles then succeeded in dethroning Augustus and coercing the Sejm (parliament) to replace him with Stanisław in 1704. Augustus regained the throne in 1709, but his own death in 1733 sparked the War of the Polish Succession in which Stanisław once more attempted to seize the crown, this time with the support of France. The Pacification Sejm culminated in Augustus III succeeding his father Frederick Augustus of Saxony.

The relative peace and inactivity that followed only weakened Poland's reputation on the world stage. Aleksander Brückner noted that Polish customs and traditions were abandoned in favour of everything foreign, and neighbouring states continued to exploit Poland to their advantage. Moreover, Western Europe's increasing exploitation of resources in the Americas rendered the Commonwealth's supplies less crucial, which resulted in financial losses. Augustus III spent little time in the Commonwealth, instead preferring the Saxon city of Dresden. He appointed Heinrich von Brühl as viceroy and minister of Polish affairs who in turn left the politics to Polish magnate families, such as the Czartoryskis and the Radziwiłłs. It was also during this period that the Polish Enlightenment began to sprout.

=== Partitions (1772–1795) ===
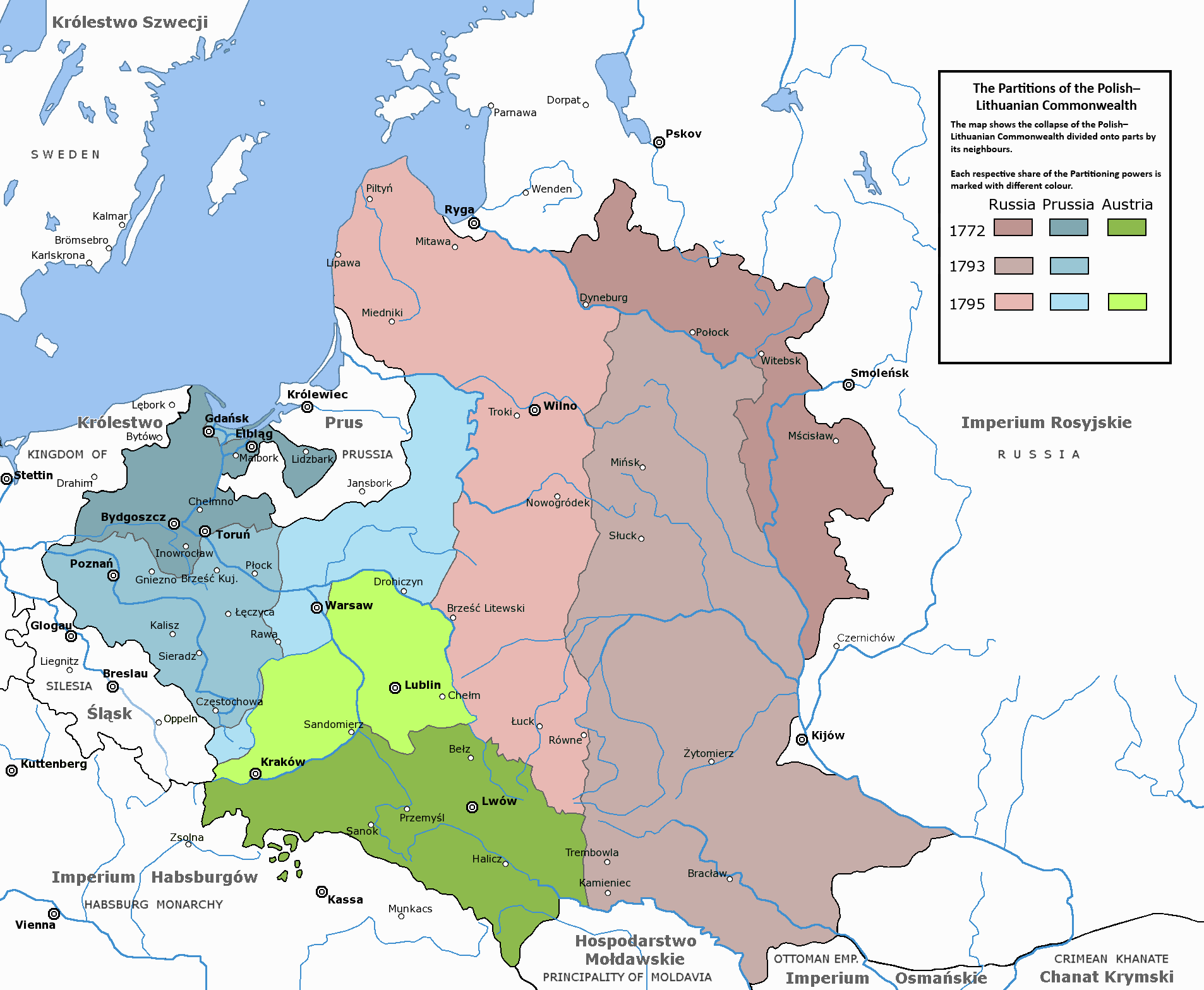
Partitions of Poland in 1772, 1793 and 1795.

In 1764, aristocrat Stanisław August Poniatowski was elected monarch with the connivance and support of his former lover Catherine the Great, a German noblewoman who became Empress of Russia.

Poniatowski's attempts at reform were met with staunch resistance both internally and externally. Any goal of stabilizing the Commonwealth was dangerous for its ambitious and aggressive neighbours. Like his predecessors, he sponsored artists and architects. In 1765 he founded the Warsaw Corps of Cadets, the first state school in Poland for all classes of society. In 1773 the king and parliament formed the Commission of National Education, the first Ministry of Education in European history. In 1792, the king ordered the creation of Virtuti Militari, the oldest military decoration still in use. Stanisław August also admired the culture of ancient kingdoms, particularly Rome and Greece; Neoclassicism became the dominant form of architectural and cultural expression.

Politically, however, the vast Commonwealth was in steady decline and by 1768, it started to be considered by Russians as a protectorate of the Russian Empire despite the fact that it was still an independent state. A majority of control over Poland was central to Catherine's diplomatic and military strategies. Attempts at reform, such as the Four-Year Sejm's May Constitution, came too late. The country was partitioned in three stages by the Russian Empire, the German Kingdom of Prussia, and the Austrian Habsburg monarchy. By 1795, the Polish–Lithuanian Commonwealth had been completely erased from the map of Europe. Poland and Lithuania were not re-established as independent countries until 1918.

== State organization and politics ==
=== Golden Liberty ===
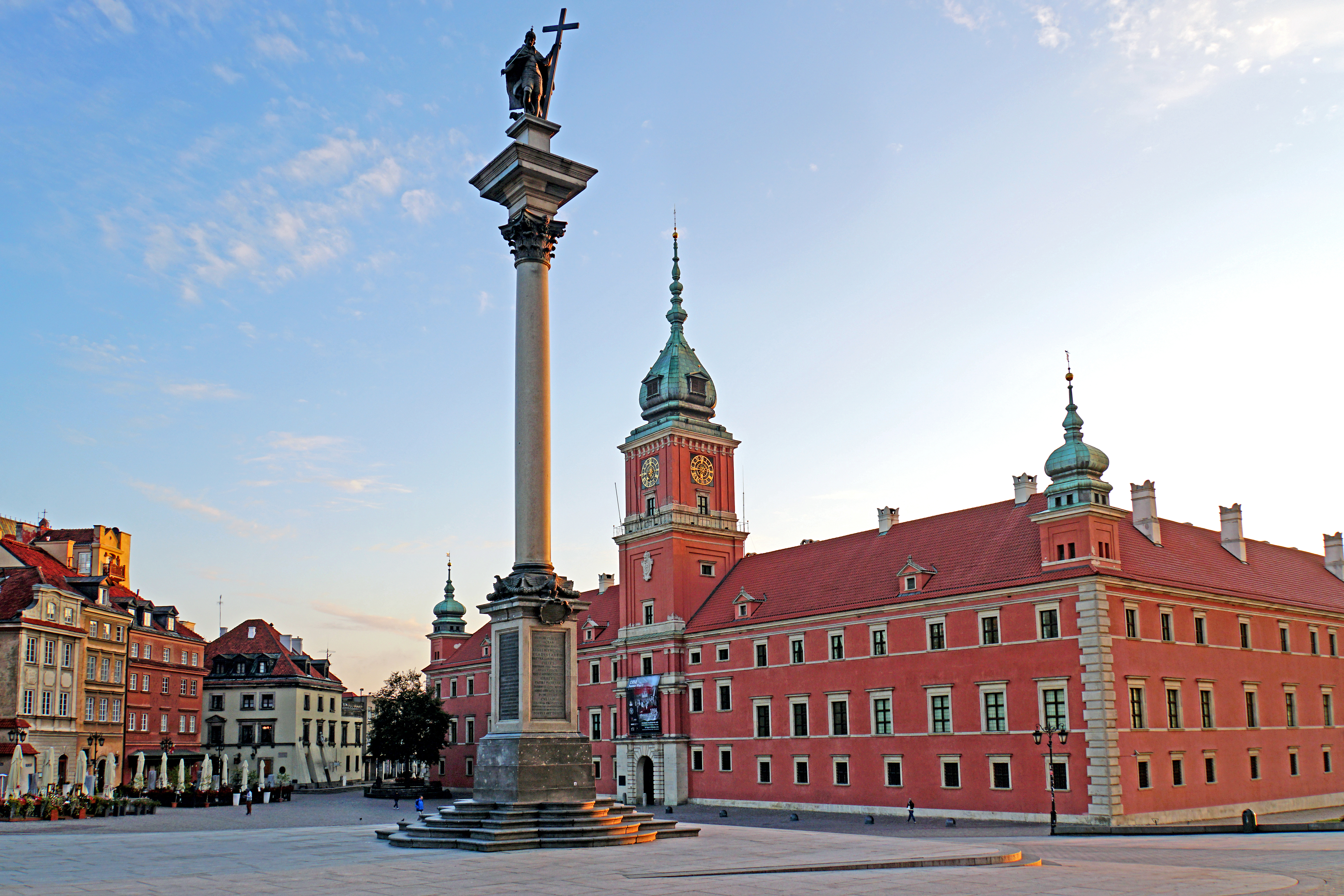
The Royal Castle in Warsaw was the formal residence of Polish kings after the capital was transferred from Kraków in 1596

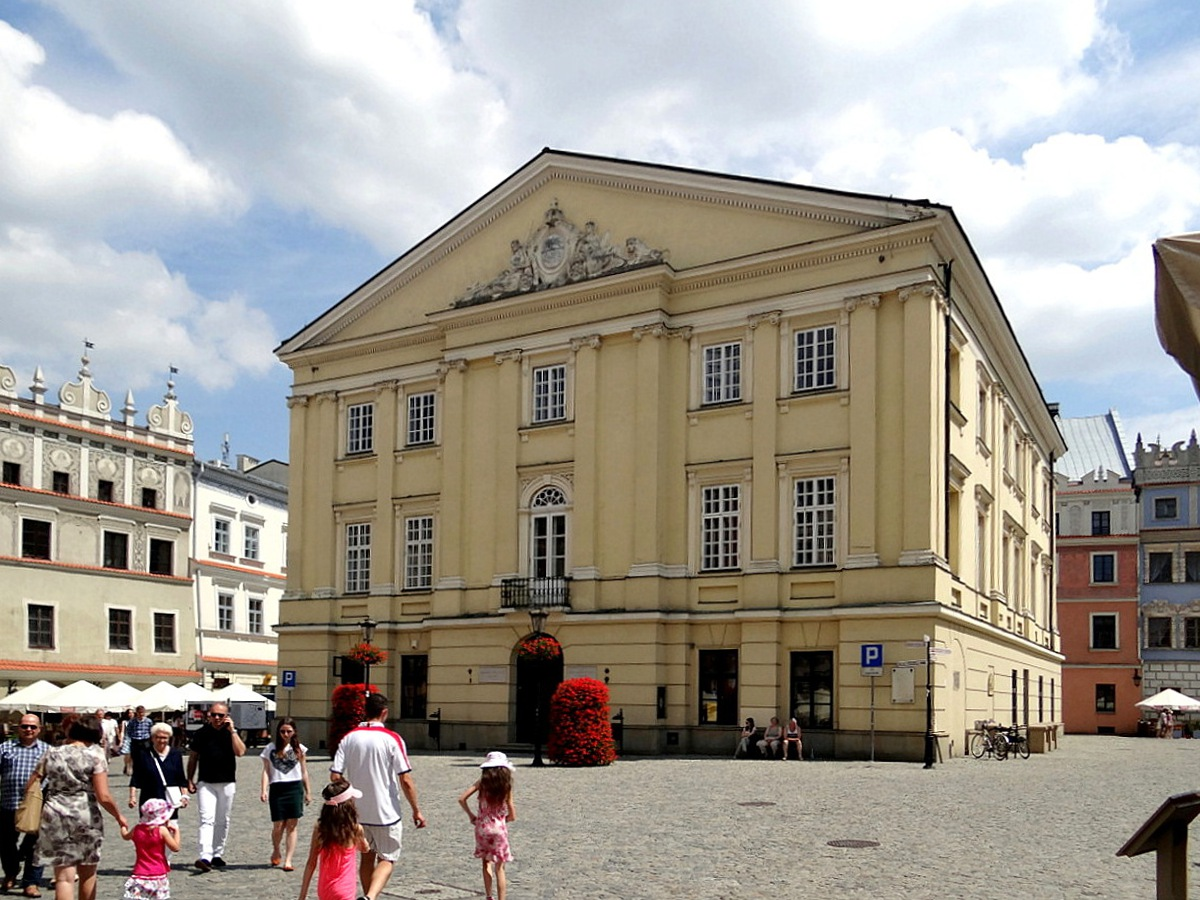
The Crown Tribunal in Lublin was the highest court of appeal in the Kingdom of Poland

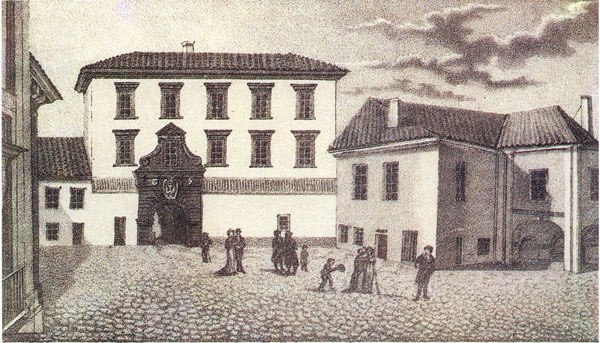
The Palace of the Lithuanian Tribunal in Vilnius, which exclusively was the highest appeal court for the Lithuanian nobility in the Grand Duchy of Lithuania

The political doctrine of the Commonwealth was our state is a republic under the presidency of the King. Chancellor Jan Zamoyski summed up this doctrine when he said that Rex regnat et non-gubernat ("The King reigns but [lit. 'and'] does not govern"). The Commonwealth had a parliament, the Sejm, as well as a Senat and an elected king (Pic. 1). The king was obliged to respect citizens' rights specified in King Henry's Articles as well as in pacta conventa, negotiated at the time of his election. The jointly elected Polish–Lithuanian monarchs' acts were void in the Grand Duchy of Lithuania without their confirmation with the Great Seal of Lithuania possessed by the Grand Chancellor of Lithuania or the Minor Seal of Lithuania possessed by the Vice-Chancellor of Lithuania, while the resolutions of the Sejm of the Polish–Lithuanian Commonwealth had to be confirmed with the Great Seal of Lithuania.

The monarch's power was limited in favour of a sizable noble class. Each new king had to pledge to uphold the Henrician Articles, which were the basis of Poland's political system (and included near-unprecedented guarantees of religious tolerance). Over time, the Henrician Articles were merged with the pacta conventa, specific pledges agreed to by the king-elect. From that point onwards, the king was effectively a partner with the noble class and was constantly supervised by a group of senators. The Sejm could veto the king on important matters, including legislation (the adoption of new laws), foreign affairs, declaration of war, and taxation (changes of existing taxes or the levying of new ones).

The foundation of the Commonwealth's political system, the "Golden Liberty" (Latin: Aurea Libertas or Polish: Złota Wolność, a term used from 1573 on), included:

- election of the king by all nobles wishing to participate, known as wolna elekcja (free election);
- Sejm, the Commonwealth parliament which the king was required to hold every two years;
- pacta conventa (Latin), "agreed-to agreements" negotiated with the king-elect, including a bill of rights, binding on the king, derived from the earlier Henrician Articles.
- religious freedom guaranteed by Warsaw Confederation Act 1573,
- rokosz (insurrection), the right of szlachta to form a legal rebellion against a king who violated their guaranteed freedoms;
- liberum veto (Latin), the right of an individual Sejm deputy to oppose a decision by the majority in a Sejm session; the voicing of such a "free veto" nullified all the legislation that had been passed at that session; during the crisis of the second half of the 17th century, Polish nobles could also use the liberum veto in provincial sejmiks;
- konfederacja (from the Latin confederatio), the right to form an organization to force through a common political aim.

The three regions (see below) of the Commonwealth enjoyed a degree of autonomy. Each voivodship had its own parliament (sejmik), which exercised serious political power, including choice of a poseł (deputy) to the national Sejm and charging of the deputy with specific voting instructions. The Grand Duchy of Lithuania had its own separate army, treasury and most other official institutions.

Golden Liberty created a state that was unusual for its time, although somewhat similar political systems existed in the contemporary city-states like the Republic of Venice. Both states were styled "Serenissima Respublica" or the "Most Serene Republic". At a time when most European countries were headed toward centralization, absolute monarchy, and religious and dynastic warfare, the Commonwealth experimented with decentralization, confederation and federation, democracy and religious tolerance.

This political system, unusual for its time, stemmed from the ascendance of the szlachta noble class over other social classes and over the political system of monarchy. In time, the szlachta accumulated enough privileges (such as those established by the Nihil novi Act of 1505) that no monarch could hope to break the szlachta's grip on power. The Commonwealth's political system is difficult to fit into a simple category, but it can be tentatively described as a mixture of:

- confederation and federation, with regard to the broad autonomy of its regions. It is, however, difficult to decisively call the Commonwealth either confederation or federation, as it had some qualities of both;
- oligarchy, as only the szlachta (nobility) – around 15% of the population – had political rights;
- democracy, since all the szlachta were equal in rights and privileges, and the Sejm could veto the king on important matters, including legislation (the adoption of new laws), foreign affairs, declaration of war, and taxation (changes of existing taxes or the levying of new ones). Also, the 15% of Commonwealth population who enjoyed those political rights (the szlachta) was a substantially larger percentage than in majority European countries even in the nineteenth century; note that in 1820 in France only about 1.5% of the male adult population had the right to vote, and in 1840 in Belgium, only about 5%.
- elective monarchy, since the monarch, elected by the szlachta, was Head of State;
- constitutional monarchy, since the monarch was bound by pacta conventa and other laws, and the szlachta could disobey any king's decrees they deemed illegal.

=== Magnate oligarchy ===
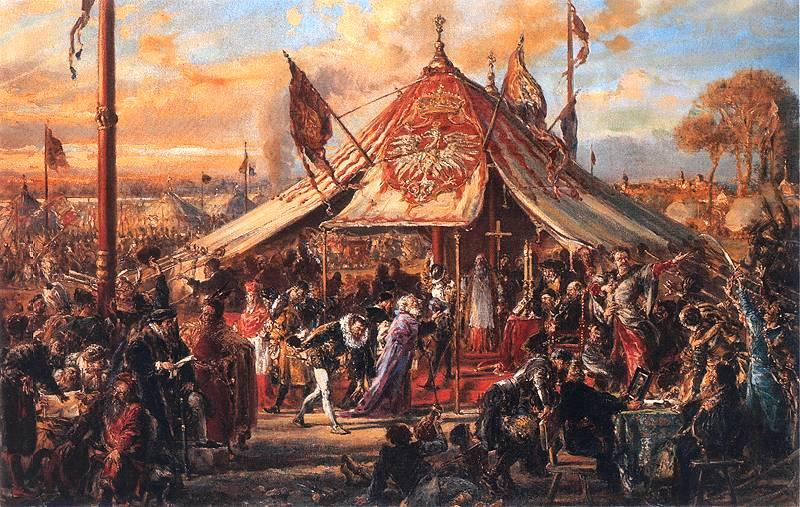
The Republic at the Zenith of Its Power, the Royal Election of 1573

The end of the Jagiellonian dynasty in 1572 – after nearly two centuries – disrupted the fragile equilibrium of the Commonwealth's government. Power increasingly slipped away from the central government to the nobility.

When presented with periodic opportunities to fill the throne, the szlachta exhibited a preference for foreign candidates who would not establish a strong and long-lasting dynasty. This policy often produced monarchs who were either totally ineffective or in constant debilitating conflict with the nobility. Furthermore, aside from notable exceptions such as the able Stefan Batory from Transylvania (1576–86), the kings of foreign origin were inclined to subordinate the interests of the Commonwealth to those of their own country and ruling house. This was especially visible in the policies and actions of the first two elected kings from the Swedish House of Vasa, whose politics brought the Commonwealth into conflict with Sweden, culminating in the war known as the Deluge (1655), one of the events that mark the end of the Commonwealth's Golden Age and the beginning of the Commonwealth's decline.

The Zebrzydowski Rebellion (1606–1607) marked a substantial increase in the power of the Polish magnates, and the transformation of szlachta democracy into magnate oligarchy. The Commonwealth's political system was vulnerable to outside interference, as Sejm deputies bribed by foreign powers might use their liberum veto to block attempted reforms. This sapped the Commonwealth and plunged it into political paralysis and anarchy for over a century, from the mid-17th century to the end of the 18th, while its neighbours stabilised their internal affairs and increased their military might.

=== Late reforms ===
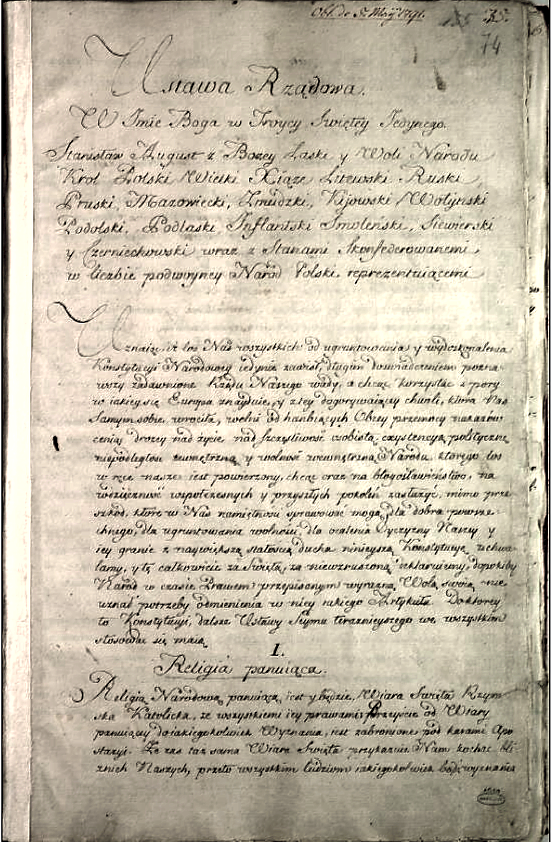
The Constitution of 3 May adopted in 1791 was the first modern constitution in Europe.

The Commonwealth did eventually make a serious effort to reform its political system, adopting in 1791 the Constitution of 3 May 1791, which historian Norman Davies calls the first of its kind in Europe. The revolutionary Constitution recast the erstwhile Polish–Lithuanian Commonwealth as a Polish–Lithuanian federal state with a hereditary monarchy and abolished many of the deleterious features of the old system.

The new constitution:

- abolished the liberum veto and banned the szlachta's confederations;
- provided for a separation of powers among legislative, executive and judicial branches of government;
- established "popular sovereignty" and extended political rights to include not only the nobility but the bourgeoisie;
- increased the rights of the peasantry;
- preserved religious tolerance (but with a condemnation of apostasy from the Catholic faith).

These reforms came too late, however, as the Commonwealth was immediately invaded from all sides by its neighbors, which had been content to leave the Commonwealth alone as a weak buffer state, but reacted strongly to attempts by king Stanisław August Poniatowski and other reformers to strengthen the country. Russia feared the revolutionary implications of the 3 May Constitution's political reforms and the prospect of the Commonwealth regaining its position as a European power. Catherine the Great regarded the May constitution as fatal to her influence and declared the Polish constitution Jacobinical. Grigori Aleksandrovich Potemkin drafted the act for the Targowica Confederation, referring to the constitution as the "contagion of democratic ideas". Meanwhile, Prussia and Austria used it as a pretext for further territorial expansion. Prussian minister Ewald Friedrich von Hertzberg called the constitution "a blow to the Prussian monarchy", fearing that a strengthened Poland would once again dominate Prussia. In the end, the 3 May Constitution was never fully implemented, and the Commonwealth entirely ceased to exist only four years after its adoption.

== Economy ==
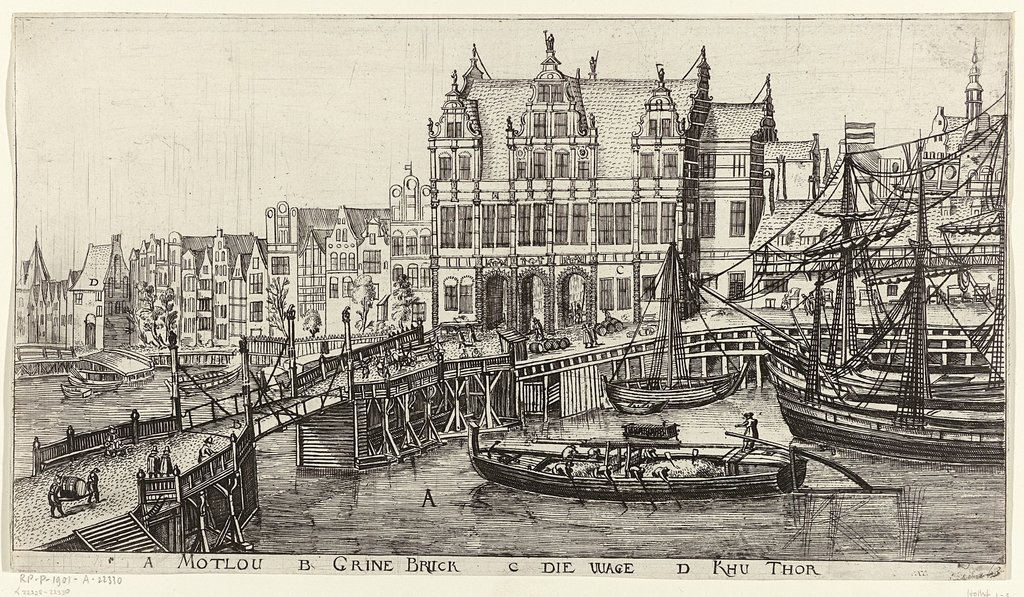
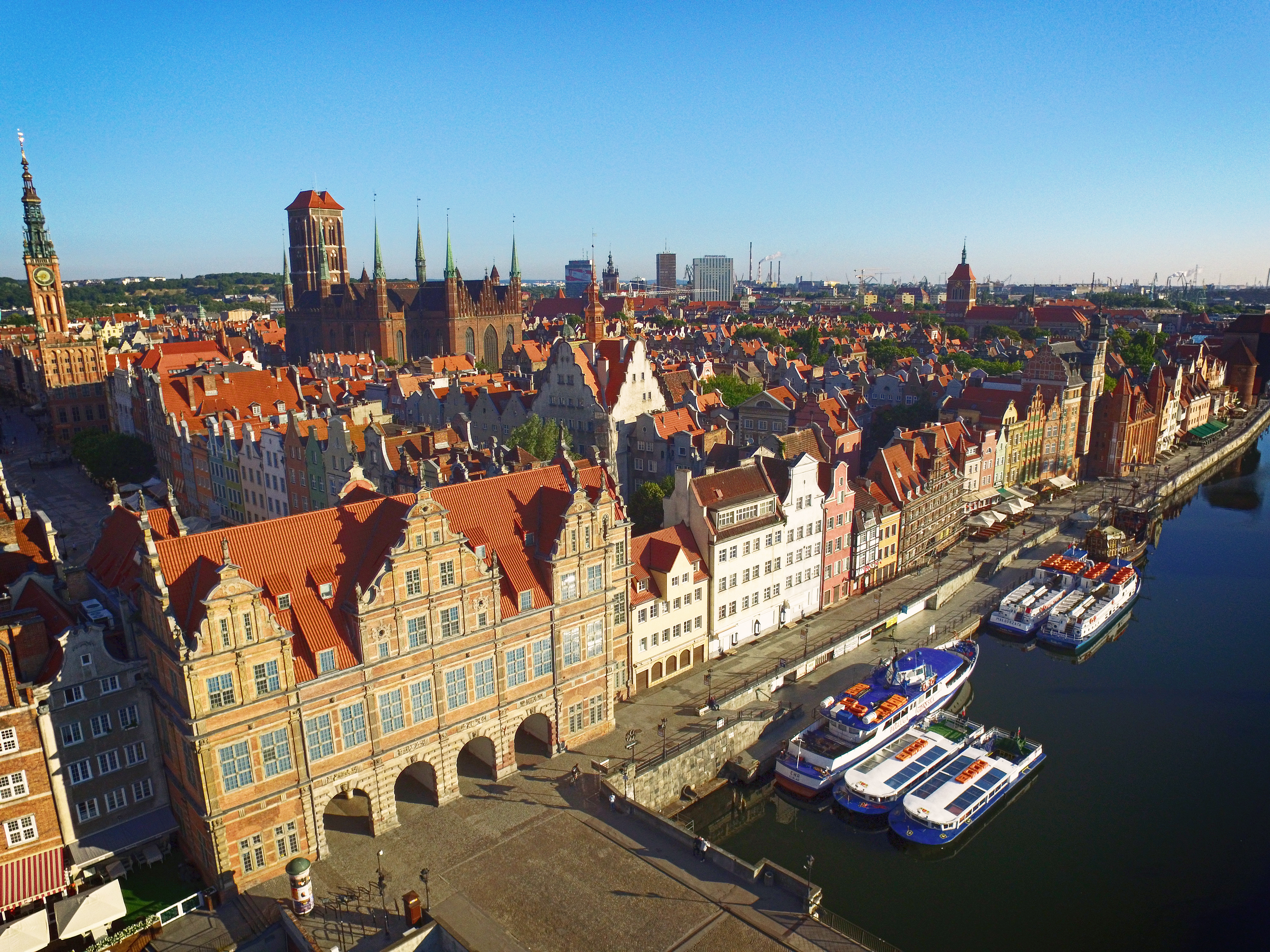
Gdańsk (Danzig), the Commonwealth's chief seaport and trading centre from which goods would be transported along the Vistula River to Warsaw, Kraków and other towns in the country.

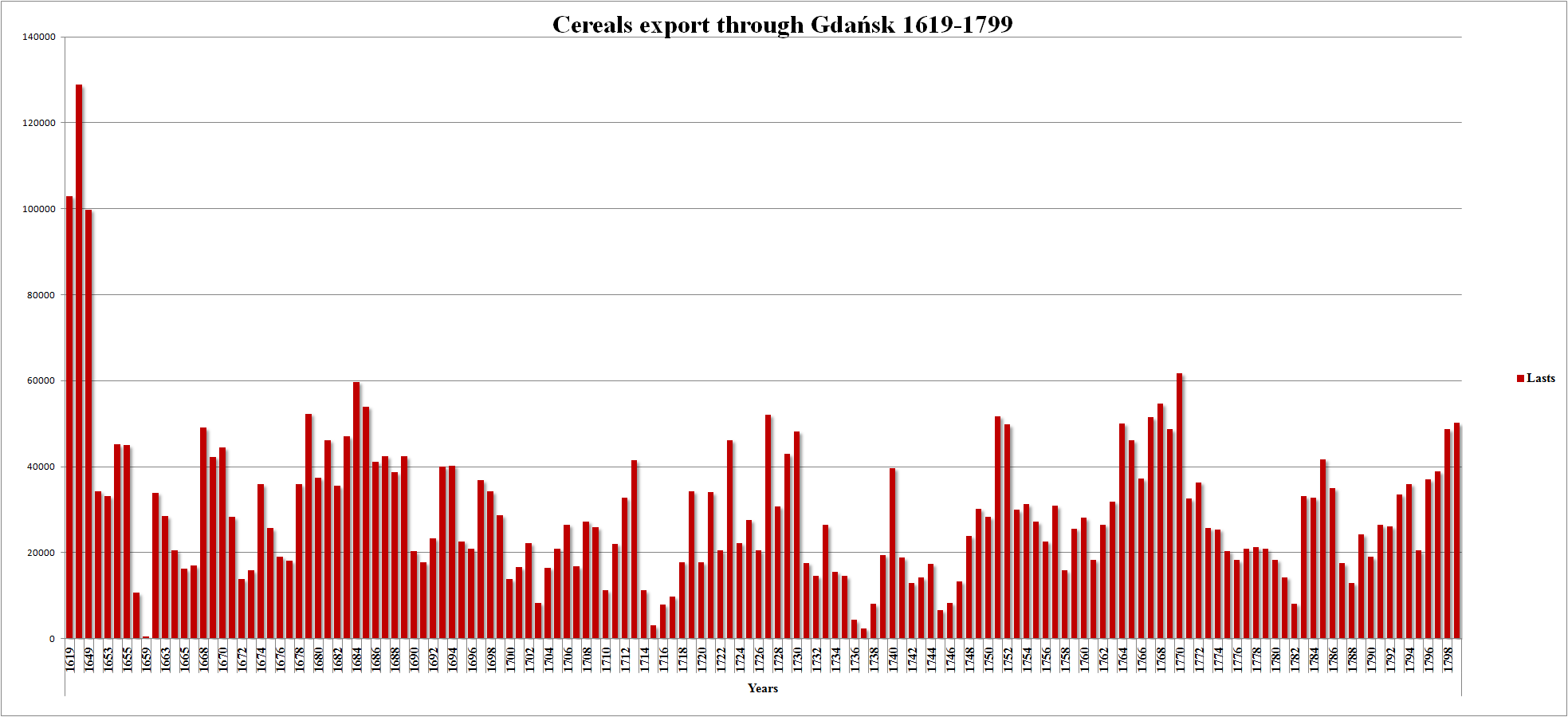
Cereals exports in the years 1619–1799. Agriculture, once extremely profitable to the nobility, became much less so after the mid-17th century.

The economy of the Commonwealth was predominantly based on agricultural output and trade, though there was an abundance of artisan workshops and manufactories – notably paper mills, leather tanneries, ironworks, glassworks and brickyards. Some major cities were home to craftsmen, jewellers and clockmakers. The majority of industries and trades were concentrated in the Kingdom of Poland; the Grand Duchy of Lithuania was more rural and its economy was driven by farming and clothmaking. Mining developed in the south-west region of Poland which was rich in natural resources such as lead, coal, copper and salt. The currency used in Poland–Lithuania was the złoty (meaning "the golden") and its subunit, the grosz. Foreign coins in the form of ducats, thalers and shillings were widely accepted and exchanged. The city of Gdańsk had the privilege of minting its own coinage. In 1794, Tadeusz Kościuszko began issuing the first Polish banknotes.

The country played a significant role in the supply of Western Europe by the export of grain (rye), cattle (oxen), furs, timber, linen, cannabis, ash, tar, carminic acid and amber. Cereals, cattle and fur amounted to nearly 90% of the country's exports to European markets by overland and maritime trade in the 16th century. From Gdańsk, ships carried cargo to the major ports of the Low Countries, such as Antwerp and Amsterdam. The land routes, mostly to the German provinces of the Holy Roman Empire such as the cities of Leipzig and Nuremberg, were used for the export of live cattle (herds of around 50,000 head), hides, salt, tobacco, hemp and cotton from the Greater Poland region. In turn, the Commonwealth imported wine, beer, fruit, exotic spices, luxury goods (e.g. tapestries, Pic. 5), furniture, and fabrics, as well as industrial products like steel and tools.

The agricultural sector was dominated by feudalism based on the plantation system (serfs). Slavery was forbidden in Poland in the 15th century, and formally abolished in Lithuania in 1588, replaced by the second enserfment. Typically a nobleman's landholding comprised a folwark, a large farmstead worked by serfs to produce surpluses for internal and external trade. This economic arrangement worked well for the ruling classes and nobles in the early years of the Commonwealth, which was one of the most prosperous eras of the grain trade. The economic strength of Commonwealth grain trade began to wane in the late 17th century. Trade relationships were disrupted by the wars, and the Commonwealth proved unable to improve its transport infrastructure or its agricultural practices. Serfs in the region were increasingly tempted to flee. The Commonwealth's major attempts at countering this problem and improving productivity consisted of increasing serfs' workload and further restricting their freedoms in a process known as export-led serfdom.

The owner of a folwark usually signed a contract with merchants of Gdańsk, who controlled 80% of this inland trade, to ship the grain north to that seaport on the Baltic Sea. Countless rivers and waterways in the Commonwealth were used for shipping purposes, including the Vistula, Pilica, Bug, San, Nida, Wieprz, and Neman. The rivers had relatively developed infrastructure, with river ports and granaries. Most of the river shipping moved north, southward transport being less profitable, and barges and rafts were often sold off in Gdańsk for lumber. Grodno become an important site after formation of a customs post at Augustów in 1569, which became a checkpoint for merchants travelling to the Crown lands from the Grand Duchy.

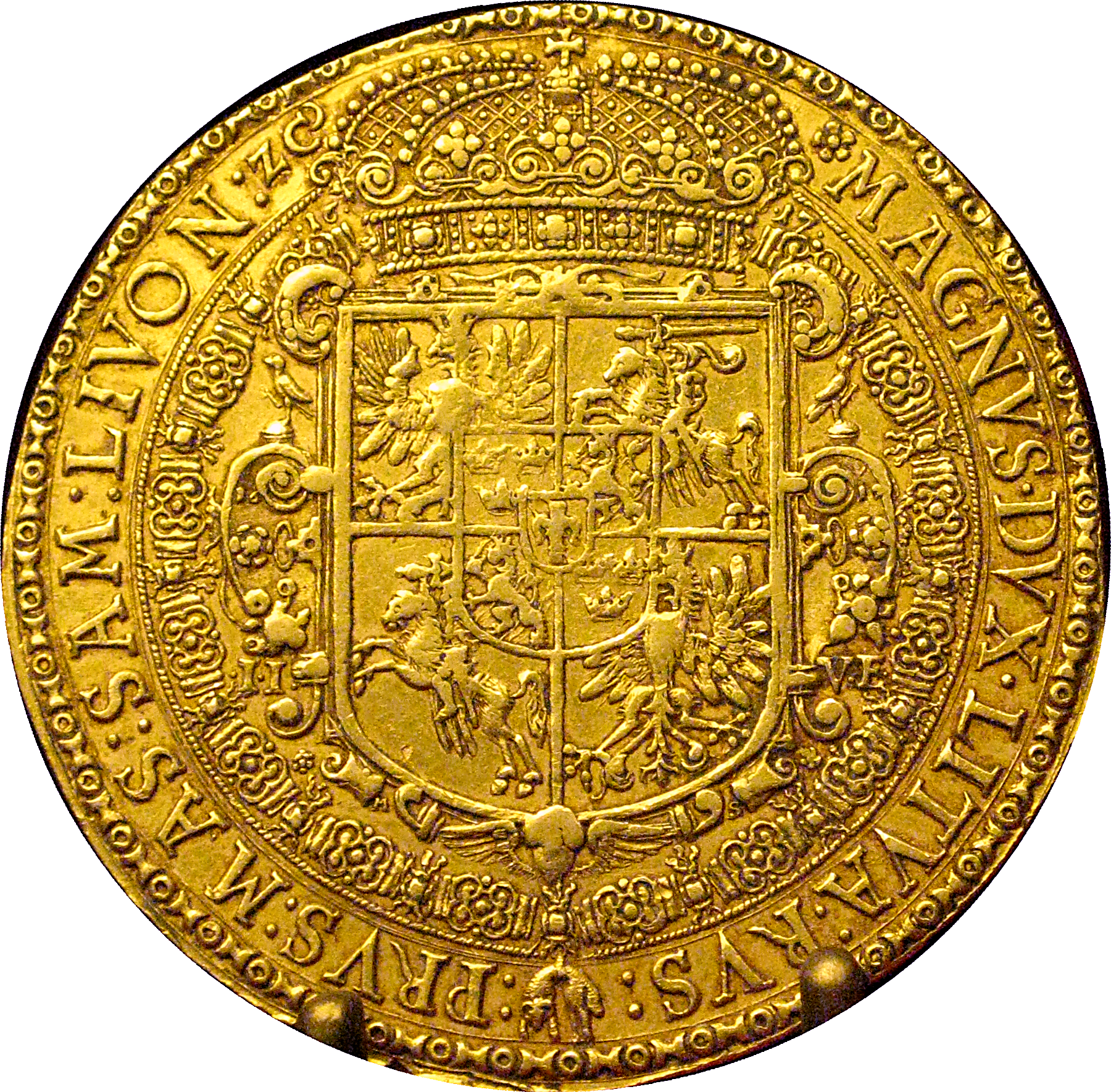
Coat of arms of the Commonwealth on a 15 ducat coin, 1617

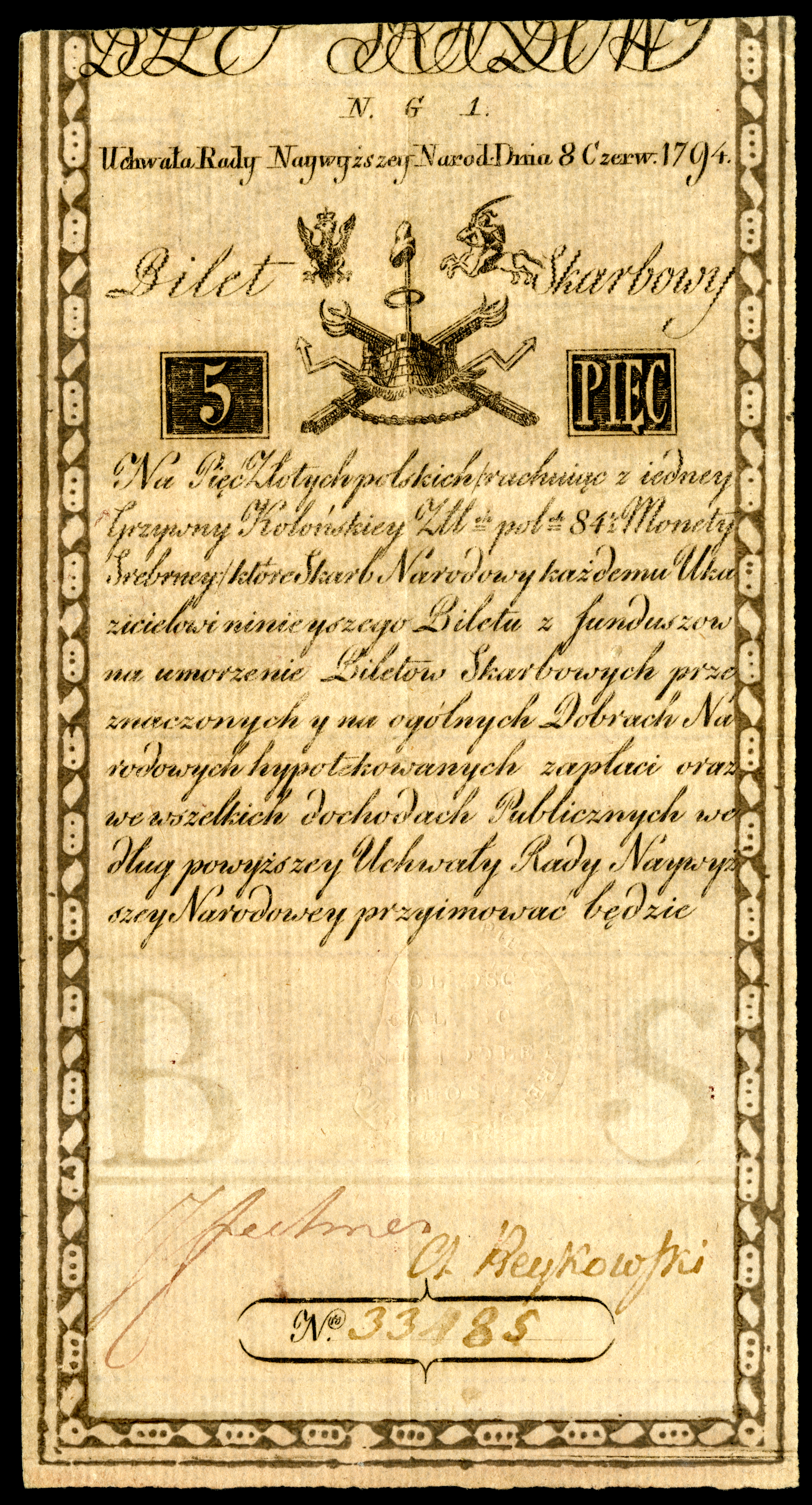
5-złoty banknote issued in 1794

Urban population of the Commonwealth was low compared to Western Europe. Exact numbers depend on calculation methods. According to one source, the urban population of the Commonwealth was about 20% of the total in the 17th century, compared to approximately 50% in the Netherlands and Italy (Pic. 7). Another source suggests much lower figures: 4–8% urban population in Poland, 34–39% in the Netherlands and 22–23% in Italy. The Commonwealth's preoccupation with agriculture, coupled with the nobles' privileged position when compared to the bourgeoisie, resulted in a fairly slow process of urbanization and thus a rather slow development of industries. The nobility could also regulate the price of grain for their advantage; they thus acquiring much wealth. Some of the largest trade fairs in the Commonwealth were held at Lublin.

Several ancient trading routes such as the Amber Road (Pic. 4) extended across Poland–Lithuania, which was situated in the heart of Europe and attracted foreign merchants or settlers. Countless goods and cultural artefacts continued to pass from one region to another via the Commonwealth, particularly as the country was a link between the Middle East, the Ottoman Empire and Western Europe. For instance, Isfahan rugs imported from Persia to the Commonwealth were incorrectly known as "Polish rugs" (French: Polonaise) in Western Europe.

== Military ==
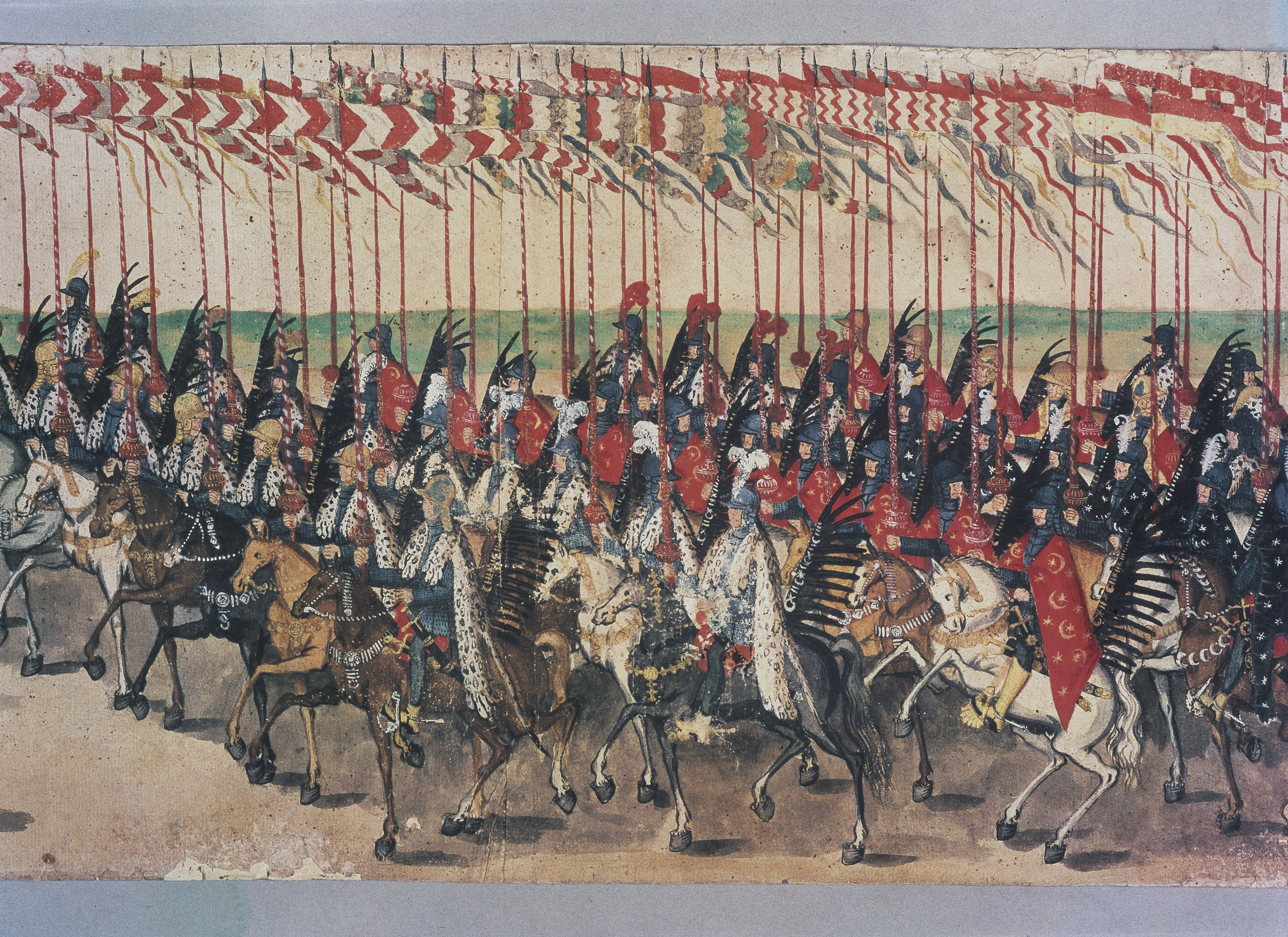
Winged Hussars were a heavy cavalry formation serving the Crown of the Kingdom of Poland throughout the 16th and 17th centuries.

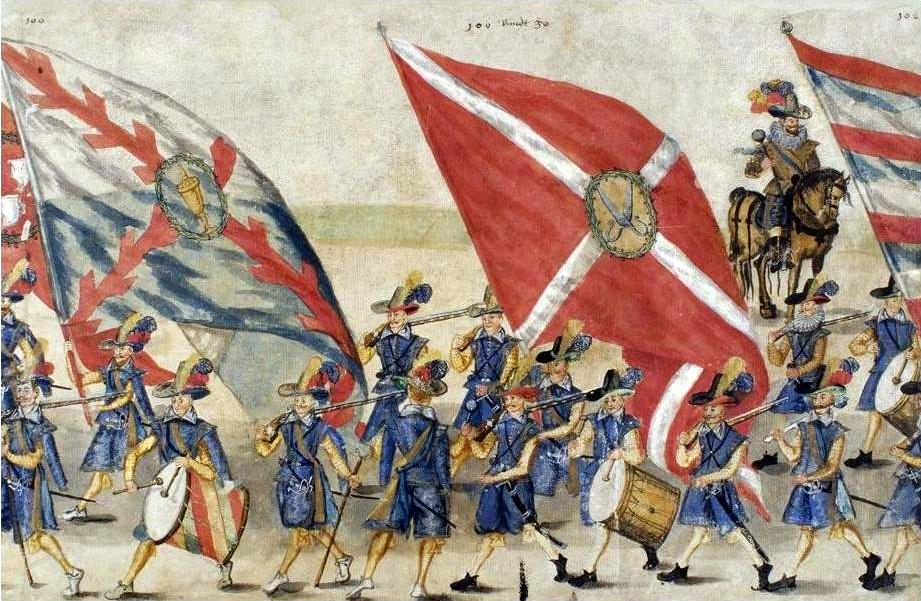
Kraków Militia, a local guard formation in the Polish–Lithuanian Commonwealth during the 16th and 17th centuries

The military in the Polish–Lithuanian Commonwealth evolved from the merger of the armies from the Polish Kingdom and from the Grand Lithuanian Duchy, though each state maintained its own division. The united armed forces comprised the Crown Army (armia koronna), recruited in Poland, and the Lithuanian Army (armia litewska) in the Grand Duchy. The military was headed by the Hetman, a rank equivalent to that of a general or supreme commander in other countries. Monarchs could not declare war or summon an army without the consent of the Sejm parliament or the Senate. The Polish–Lithuanian Commonwealth Navy never played a major role in the military structure from the mid-17th century onwards.

The most prestigious formation of the two respective armies was their 16th- and 17th-century heavy cavalry in the form of Winged Hussars (husaria), whereas the Polish Royal Guards and Lithuanian Guards were the elite of the infantry; the regiments were supervised by the king and his family. In 1788, the Great Sejm approved landslide reforms and defined future structures of the military; the Crown Army was to be split into four divisions, with seventeen field infantry regiments and eight cavalry brigades excluding special units; the Lithuanian Army was to be subdivided into two divisions, eight field regiments and two cavalry brigades excluding special units. If implemented, the reform predicted an army of almost 100,000 men.

The armies of those states differed from the organization common in other parts of Europe; according to Bardach, the mercenary formations (wojsko najemne), common in Western Europe, never gained widespread popularity in Poland. Brzezinski, however, notes that foreign mercenaries did form a significant portion of the more elite infantry units, at least until the early 17th century. In 16th-century Poland, several other formations formed the core of the military. There was a small standing army, obrona potoczna ("continuous defense") about 1,500–3,000 strong, paid for by the king, and primarily stationed at the troubled southern and eastern borders. It was supplemented by two formations mobilised in case of war – the pospolite ruszenie (Polish for levée en masse – feudal levy of mostly noble knights-landholders), and the wojsko zaciężne, recruited by the Polish commanders for the conflict. It differed from other European mercenary formations in that it was commanded by Polish officers, and dissolved after the conflict had ended.

Several years before the Union of Lublin, the Polish obrona potoczna was reformed, as the Sejm (national parliament of Poland) legislated in 1562–1563 the creation of wojsko kwarciane, named after kwarta tax levied on the royal lands for the purpose of maintaining this formation. This formation was also paid for by the king, and in the peacetime, numbered about 3,500–4,000 men according to Bardach; Brzezinski gives the range of 3,000–5,000. It was composed mostly of light cavalry units manned by nobility (szlachta) and commanded by hetmans. Often, in wartime, the Sejm would legislate a temporary increase in the size of the wojsko kwarciane.

Following the end of the Commonwealth, the Polish–Lithuanian military tradition was continued by the Napoleonic Polish Legions and the Army of the Duchy of Warsaw.

== Culture ==
=== Science and literature ===
Multi-stage rocket from Artis Magnæ Artilleriæ pars prima by Kazimierz Siemienowicz

The Commonwealth was an important European center for the development of modern social and political ideas. It was famous for its rare quasi-democratic political system, praised by philosophers, and during the Counter-Reformation was known for near-unparalleled religious tolerance, with peacefully coexisting Roman Catholic, Jewish, Orthodox Christian, Protestant and Muslim (Sufi) communities. In the 18th century, the French Catholic Rulhiere wrote of 16th century Poland: "This country, which in our day we have seen divided on the pretext of religion, is the first state in Europe that exemplified tolerance. In this state, mosques arose between churches and synagogues." The Commonwealth gave rise to the famous Christian sect of the Polish Brethren, antecedents of British and American Unitarianism.

With its political system, the Commonwealth gave birth to political philosophers such as Andrzej Frycz Modrzewski (1503–1572) (Pic. 9), Wawrzyniec Grzymała Goślicki (1530–1607) and Piotr Skarga (1536–1612). Later, works by Stanisław Staszic (1755–1826) and Hugo Kołłątaj (1750–1812) helped pave the way for the Constitution of 3 May 1791, which Norman Davies calls the first of its kind in Europe.

Kraków's Jagiellonian University is one of the oldest universities in the world (established in 1364), together with the Jesuit Academy of Wilno (established in 1579) they were the major scholarly and scientific centers in the Commonwealth. The Komisja Edukacji Narodowej, Polish for Commission for National Education, formed in 1773, was the world's first national Ministry of Education. Commonwealth scientists included: Martin Kromer (1512–1589), historian and cartographer; Michael Sendivogius (1566–1636), alchemist and chemist; Jan Brożek (Ioannes Broscius in Latin) (1585–1652), polymath: a mathematician, physician and astronomer; Krzysztof Arciszewski (Crestofle d'Artischau Arciszewski in Portuguese) (1592–1656), engineer, ethnographer, general and admiral of the Dutch West Indies Company army in the war with the Spanish Empire for control of Brazil; Kazimierz Siemienowicz (1600–1651), military engineer, artillery specialist and a founder of rocketry; Johannes Hevelius (1611–1687), astronomer, founder of lunar topography; Michał Boym (1612–1659), orientalist, cartographer, naturalist and diplomat in Ming Dynasty's service (Pic. 11); Adam Adamandy Kochański (1631–1700), mathematician and engineer; Baal Shem Tov (הבעל שם טוב in Hebrew) (1698–1760), considered to be the founder of Hasidic Judaism; Marcin Odlanicki Poczobutt (1728–1810), astronomer and mathematician (Pic. 12); Jan Krzysztof Kluk (1739–1796), naturalist, agronomist and entomologist, John Jonston (1603–1675) scholar and physician, descended from Scottish nobility. In 1628 the Czech teacher, scientist, educator, and writer John Amos Comenius took refuge in the Commonwealth, when the Protestants were persecuted under the Counter Reformation.

The works of many Commonwealth authors are considered classics, including those of Jan Kochanowski (Pic. 10), Wacław Potocki, Ignacy Krasicki, and Julian Ursyn Niemcewicz. Many szlachta members wrote memoirs and diaries. Perhaps the most famous are the Memoirs of Polish History by Albrycht Stanisław Radziwiłł (1595–1656) and the Memoirs of Jan Chryzostom Pasek (ca. 1636–ca. 1701). Jakub Sobieski (1590–1646) (father of John III Sobieski) wrote notable diaries. During the Khotyn expedition in 1621 he wrote a diary called Commentariorum chotinensis belli libri tres (Diary of the Chocim War), which was published in 1646 in Gdańsk. It was used by Wacław Potocki as a basis for his epic poem, Transakcja wojny chocimskiej (The Progress of the War of Chocim). He also authored instructions for the journey of his sons to Kraków (1640) and France (1645), a good example of liberal education of the era.

=== Art and music ===
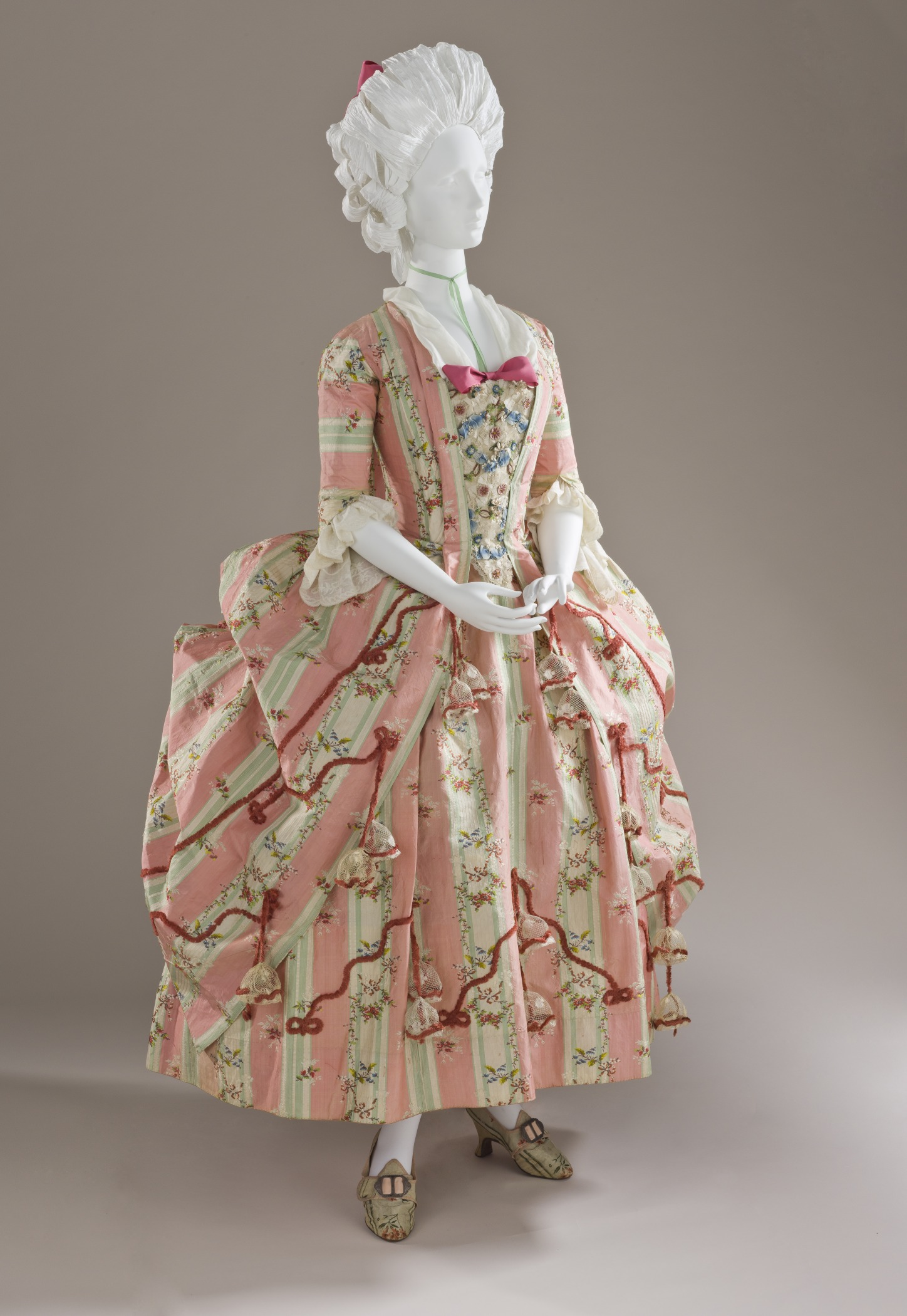
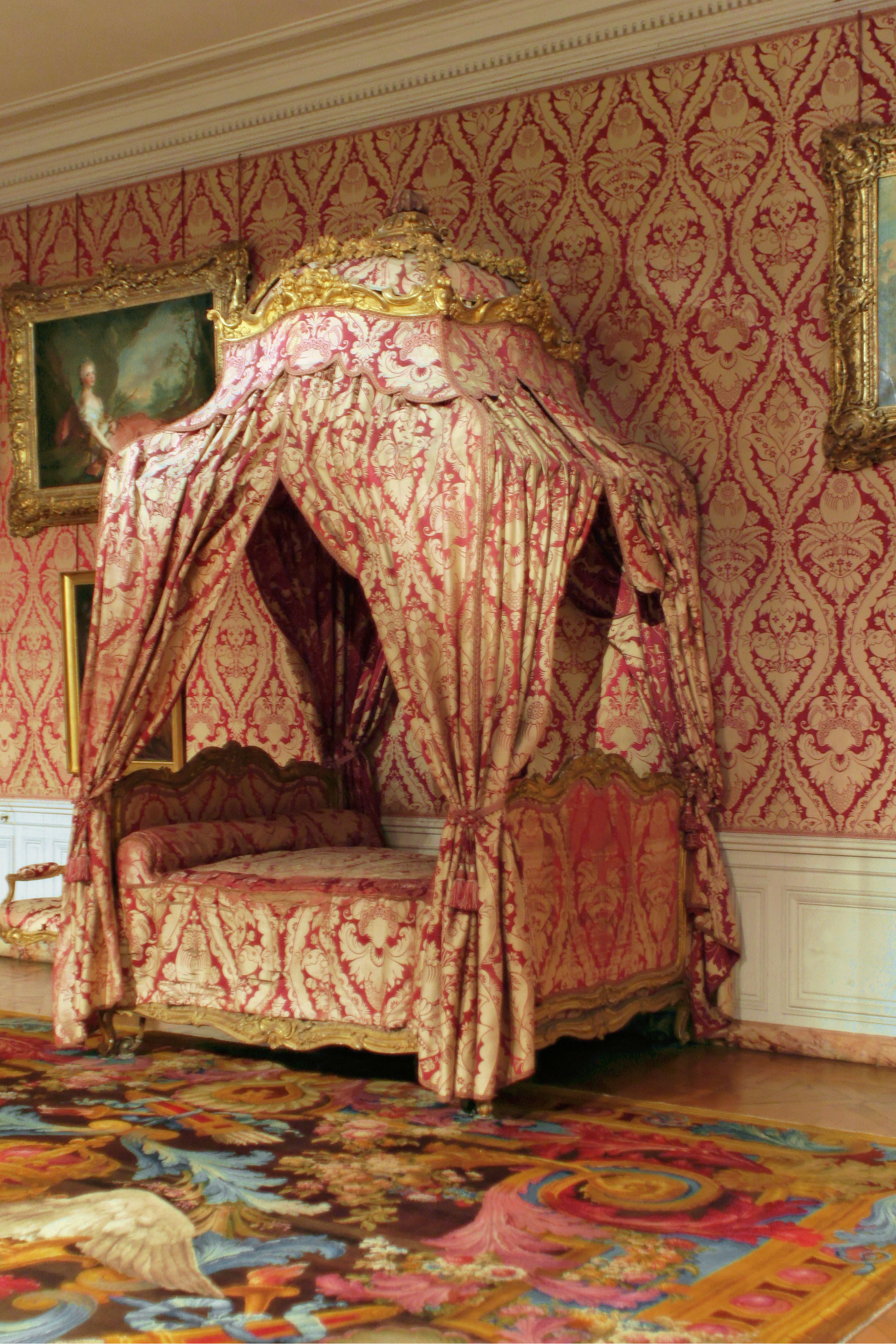
Polonaise dress (left) and the Polish bed (right), both from the 18th century

The art and music of the Commonwealth was largely shaped by prevailing European trends, though the country's minorities, foreigners as well as native folk cultures also contributed to its versatile nature. A common art form of the Sarmatian period were coffin portraits (portrety trumienne) used in funerals and other important ceremonies. As a rule, such portraits were nailed to sheet metal, six- or eight- sided in shape, fixed to the front of a coffin placed on a high, ornate catafalque. These were a unique and distinguishable feature of the Commonwealth's high culture, not found elsewhere in Europe. A similar tradition was only practiced in Roman Egypt. Polish monarchs and nobles frequently invited and sponsored foreign painters and artisans, notably from the Low Countries (the Netherlands, Flanders and Belgium), Germany or Italy. The interiors of upper-class residences, palaces and manors were adorned by wall tapestries (arrasy or tapiseria) imported from Western Europe; the most renowned collection are the Jagiellonian tapestries exhibited at Wawel Royal Castle in Kraków.

The economic, cultural and political ties between France and the Polish–Lithuanian Commonwealth gave rise to the term à la polonaise, French for "Polish-styled". With the marriage of Marie Leszczyńska to Louis XV of France in 1725, Polish culture began to flourish at the Palace of Versailles. Polish beds (lit à la polonaise) draped with baldachins became a centrepiece of Louis XV furniture in French chateaus. Folk flower motifs as well as Polish fashion were popularised in the form of a back-draped polonaise dress (robe à la polonaise) worn by aristocrats at Versailles.

The religious cultures of Poland–Lithuania coexisted and penetrated each other for the entirety of the Commonwealth's history – the Jews adopted elements of the national dress, loanwords and calques became commonplace and Roman Catholic churches in regions with significant Protestant populations were much simpler in décor than those in other parts of Poland–Lithuania. Mutual influence was further reflected in the great popularity of Byzantine icons (Pic. 13) and the icons resembling effigies of Mary in the predominantly Latin territories of today's Poland (Black Madonna) and Lithuania (Our Lady of the Gate of Dawn). Conversely, Latin infiltration into Ruthenian Orthodox and Protestant art was also conventional (Pic. 3).

Music was a common feature of religious and secular events. To that end many noblemen founded church and school choirs, and employed their own ensembles of musicians. Some, like Stanisław Lubomirski built their own opera houses (in Nowy Wiśnicz). Others, like Janusz Skumin Tyszkiewicz and Krzysztof Radziwiłł were known for their sponsorship of arts which manifested itself in their permanently retained orchestras, at their courts in Wilno (Vilnius). Musical life further flourished under the House of Vasa. Both foreign and domestic composers were active in the Commonwealth. Sigismund III brought in Italian composers and conductors, such as Luca Marenzio, Annibale Stabile, Asprilio Pacelli, Marco Scacchi and Diomedes Cato for the royal orchestra. Notable home grown musicians, who also composed and played for the King's court, included Bartłomiej Pękiel, Jacek Różycki, Adam Jarzębski, Marcin Mielczewski, Stanisław Sylwester Szarzyński, Damian Stachowicz, Mikołaj Zieleński and Grzegorz Gorczycki.

=== Architecture ===
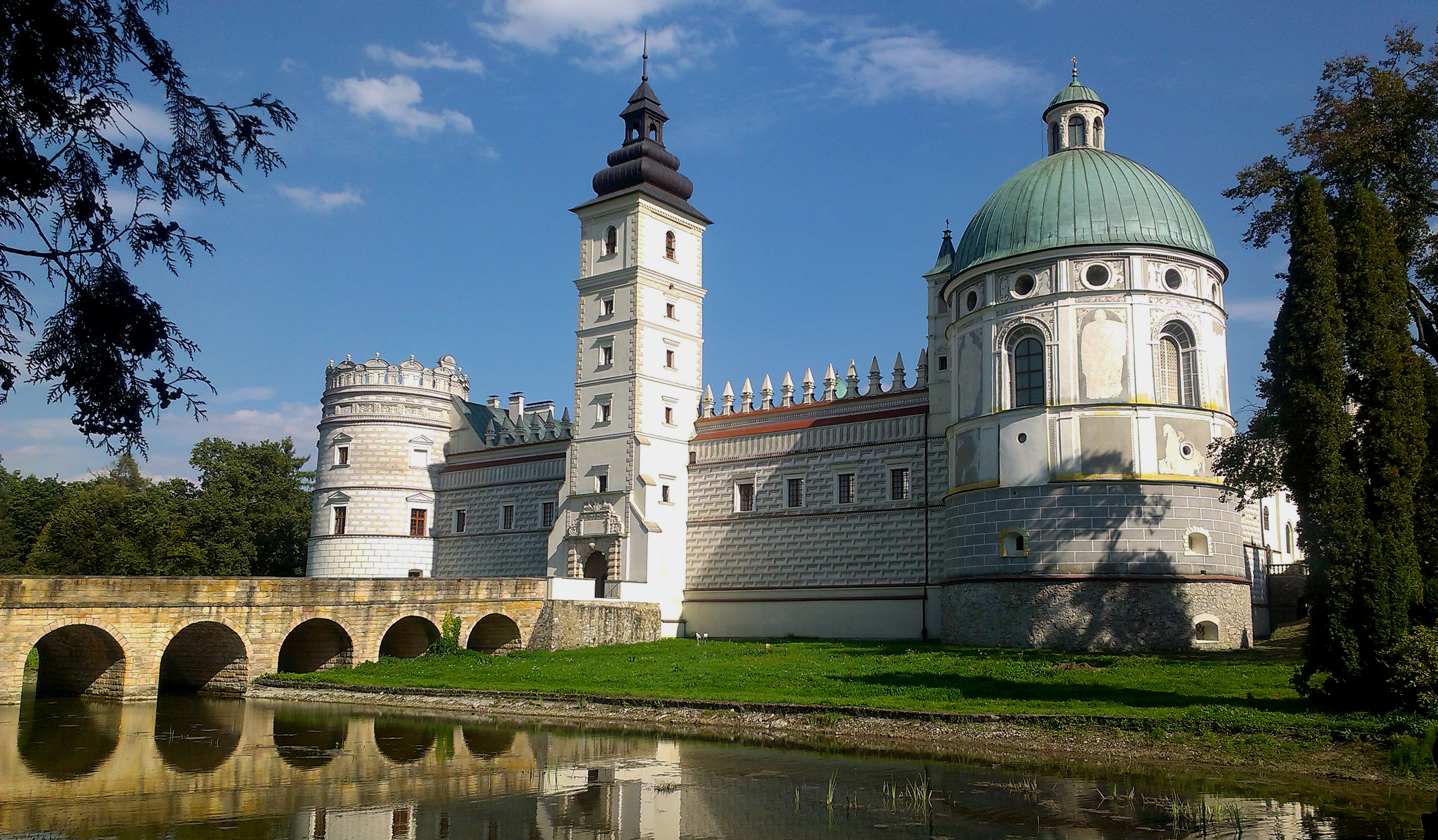
Krasiczyn Castle was built between 1580 and 1631 in the mannerist style.

The architecture of the cities in the Polish–Lithuanian Commonwealth reflected a combination of Polish, German and Italian trends. Italian Mannerism or the Late Renaissance had a profound impact on traditional burgher architecture which can be observed to this day – castles and tenements were fitted with central Italianate courtyards composed of arched loggias, colonnades, bay windows, balconies, portals and ornamental balustrades. Ceiling frescos, sgraffito, plafonds and coffering (patterned ceilings; Polish kaseton; from Italian cassettone) were widespread. Rooftops were generally covered with terracotta rooftiles. The most distinguishable feature of Polish Mannerism are decorative "attics" above the cornice on the façade. Cities in northern Poland–Lithuania and in Livonia adopted the Hanseatic (or "Dutch") style as their primary form of architectural expression, comparable to that of the Netherlands, Belgium, northern Germany and Scandinavia.

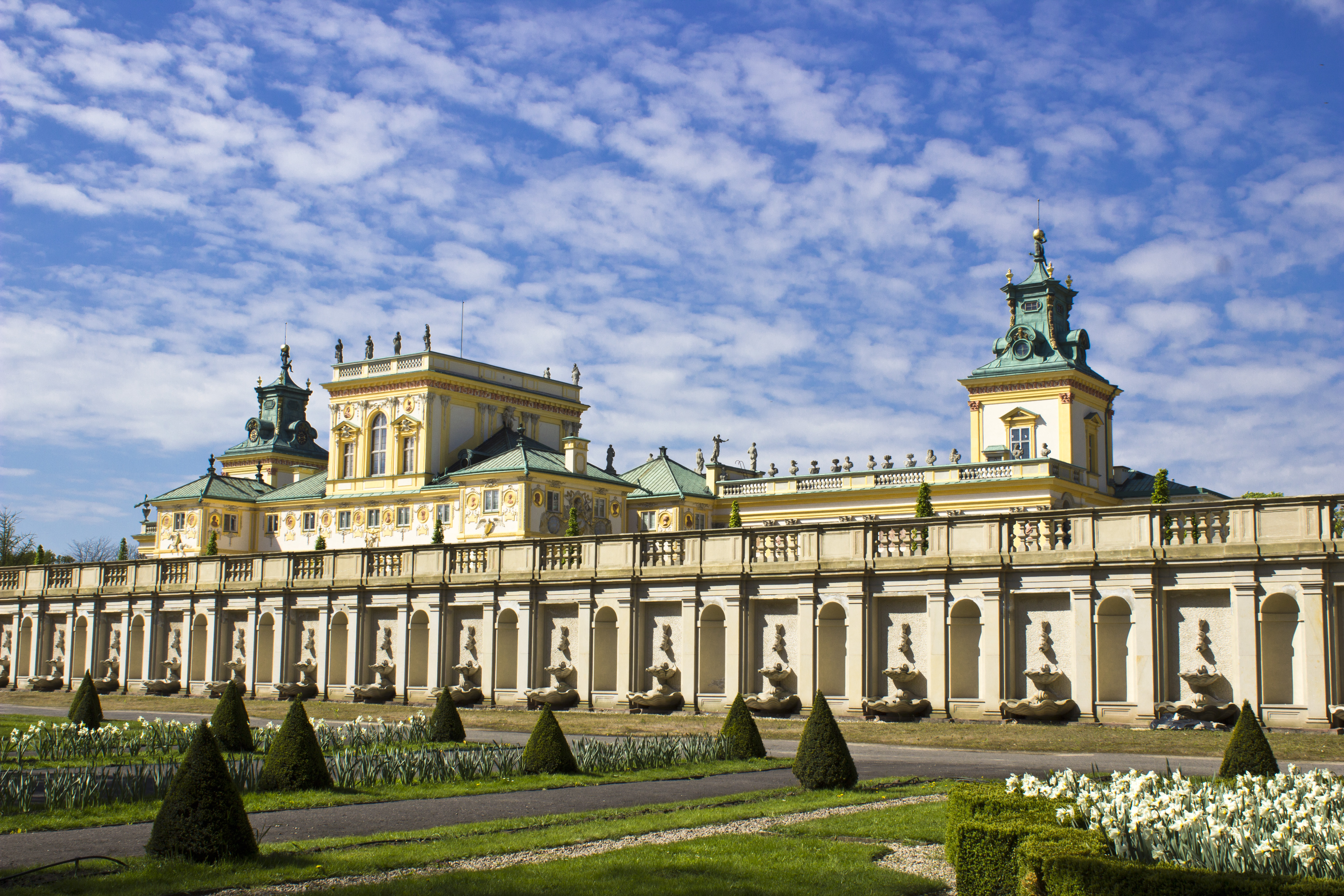
Wilanów Palace, completed in 1696, exemplifies the opulence of royal and noble residences in the Commonwealth.

The introduction of Baroque architecture was marked by construction of several Jesuit and Roman Catholic churches across Poland and Lithuania, notably the Peter and Paul Church in Kraków, the Corpus Christi Church in Nesvizh, Lublin Cathedral and UNESCO-enlisted sanctuary at Kalwaria Zebrzydowska. Fine examples of decorative Baroque and Rococo include Saint Anne's in Kraków and the Fara Church in Poznań. Another characteristic is the common usage of black marble. Altars, fonts, portals, balustrades, columns, monuments, tombstones, headstones and whole rooms (e.g. Marble Room at the Royal Castle in Warsaw, St. Casimir Chapel of the Vilnius Cathedral and Vasa Chapel at Wawel Cathedral) were extensively decorated with black marble, which became popular after the mid-17th century.

Magnates often undertook construction projects as monuments to themselves: churches, cathedrals, monasteries (Pic. 14), and palaces like the present-day Presidential Palace in Warsaw and Pidhirtsi Castle built by Grand Hetman Stanisław Koniecpolski. The largest projects involved entire towns, although in time many of them would lapse into obscurity or were abandoned. These towns were generally named after the sponsoring magnate. Among the most prominent is Zamość, founded by Jan Zamoyski and designed by the Italian architect Bernardo Morando as an ideal city. The magnates throughout Poland competed with the kings. The monumental castle Krzyżtopór, built in the style palazzo in fortezza between 1627 and 1644, had several courtyards surrounded by fortifications. Similar fortified complexes include castles in Łańcut and Krasiczyn.

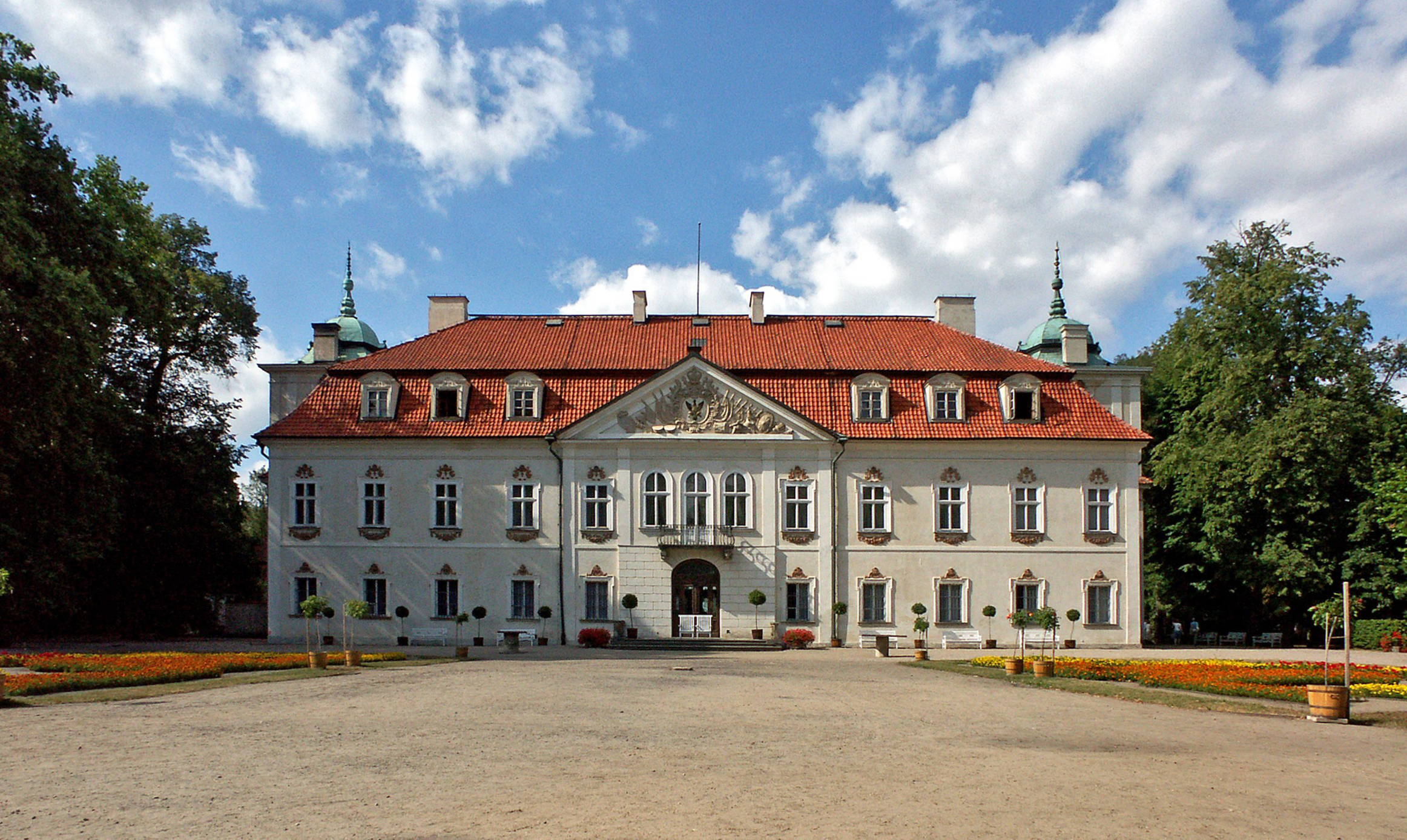
Nieborów Palace designed by Dutch architect Tylman van Gameren and built in 1697

The fascination with the culture and art of the Orient in the late Baroque period is reflected by Queen Marie's Chinese Palace in Zolochiv (Złoczów). 18th-century magnate palaces represents the characteristic type of Baroque suburban residence built entre cour et jardin (between the entrance court and the garden). Its architecture – a merger of European art with old Commonwealth building traditions are visible in Wilanów Palace in Warsaw (Pic. 15), Branicki Palace in Białystok, Potocki Palace in Radzyń Podlaski, Raczyński Palace in Rogalin, Nieborów Palace and Kozłówka Palace near Lubartów. Lesser nobility resided in country manor houses known as dworek. Neoclassicism replaced Baroque by the second half of the 18th century – the last ruler of the Poland–Lithuania, Stanisław August Poniatowski, greatly admired the classical architecture of Ancient Rome and promoted it as a symbol of the Polish Enlightenment. The Palace on the Isle and the exterior of St. Anne's Church in Warsaw are part of the neoclassical legacy of the former Commonwealth.

=== Szlachta and Sarmatism ===
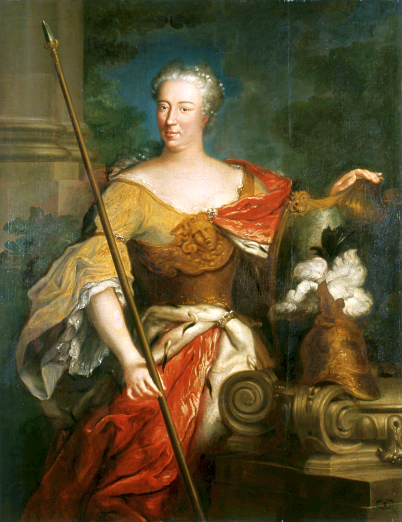
The First Lady of the Republic – Elżbieta Sieniawska portrayed in Sarmata pose and in a male coat called delia

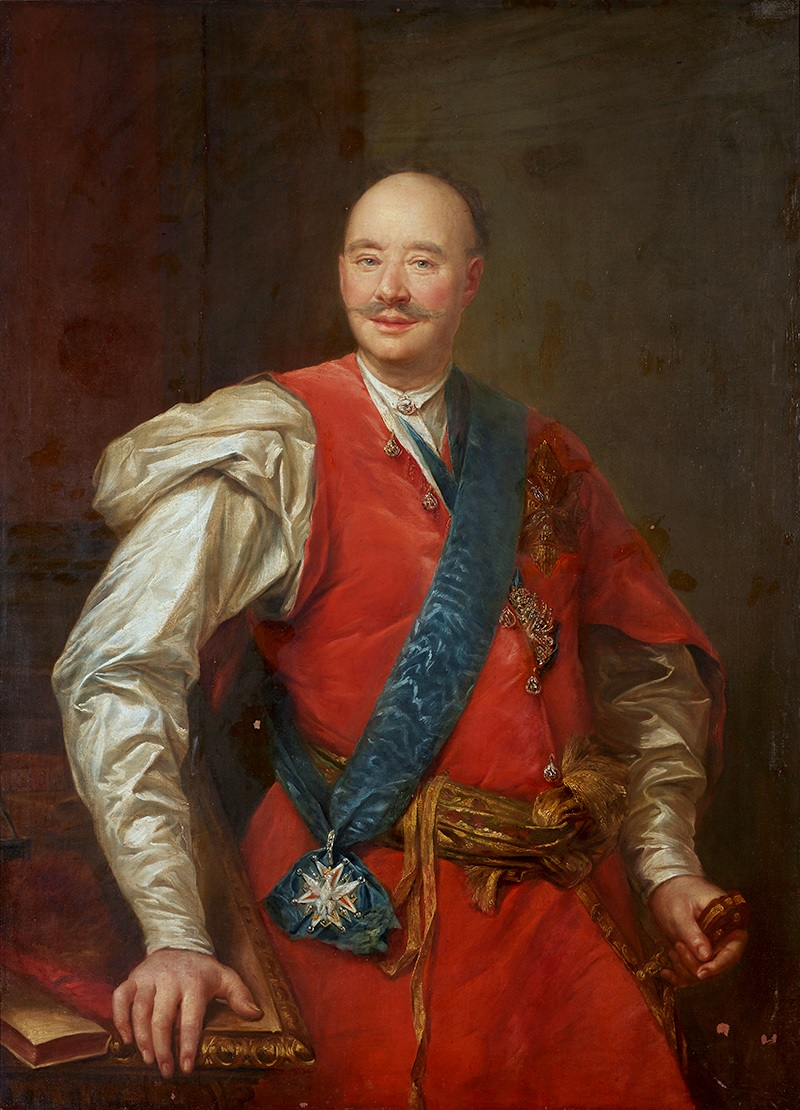
Sarmatian style for men; moustache, red kontusz coat, gold-silk pas with blue sash of the Order of the White Eagle

The prevalent ideology of the szlachta became "Sarmatism", named after the Sarmatians, alleged ancestors of the Poles. This belief system was an important part of szlachta culture, penetrating all aspects of its life. Sarmatism enshrined equality among szlachta, horseback riding, tradition, provincial quaint life in manor houses, peace and pacifism; championed oriental-inspired souvenirs or attire for men (żupan, kontusz, sukmana, pas kontuszowy, delia, szabla); favoured European Baroque architecture; endorsed Latin as a language of thought or expression; and served to integrate the multi-ethnic nobility by creating an almost nationalistic sense of unity and of pride in Golden Liberty.

In its early, idealistic form, Sarmatism represented a positive cultural movement: it supported religious belief, honesty, national pride, courage, equality and freedom. In time, however, it became distorted. Late extreme Sarmatism turned belief into bigotry, honesty into political naïveté, pride into arrogance, courage into stubbornness and freedom into anarchy. The faults of Sarmatism were blamed for the demise of the country from the late 18th century onwards. Criticism, often one-sided and exaggerated, was used by the Polish reformists to push for radical changes. This self-deprecation was accompanied by works of German, Russian and Austrian historians, who tried to prove that it was Poland itself that was to blame for its fall.

=== Demographics ===
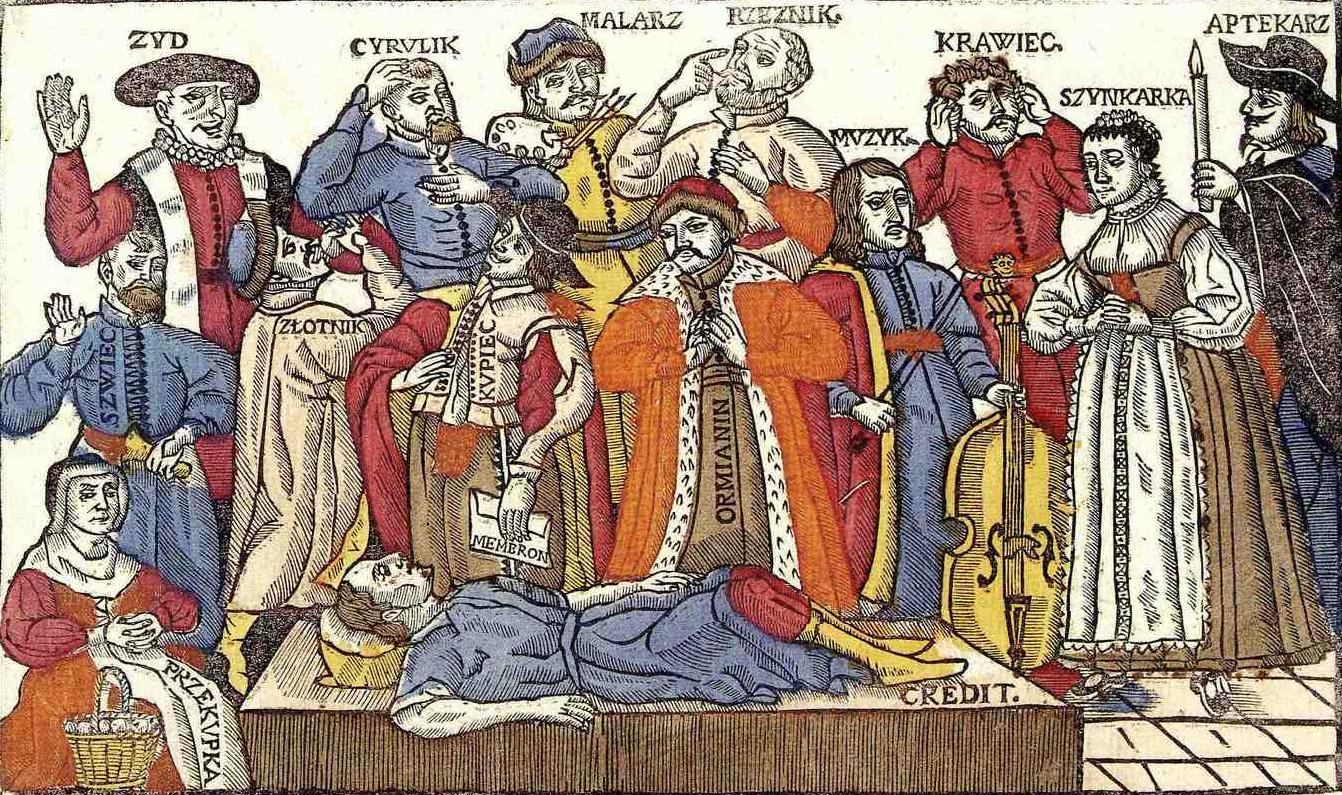
Social strata in the Commonwealth's society in 1655. Back row from the left: Jew (żyd), barber surgeon (cyrulik), painter (malarz), butcher (rzeznik), tailor (krawiec), pharmacist (aptekarz). Middle row from the left: shoemaker (szwiec), goldsmith (zlotnik), merchant (kupiec), Armenian (ormianin), musician (muzyk), barmaid (szynkarka). In front, a vendor (przekupka).

The Polish–Lithuanian Commonwealth was immensely multicultural throughout its existence – it comprised countless religious identities and ethnic minorities inhabiting the country's vast territory. The precise number of minority groups and their populations can only be hypothesised. Statistically, the most prominent groups were the Poles, Lithuanians, Germans, Ruthenians and Jews. There were also considerable numbers of Czechs, Hungarians, Livonians, Romanis, Vlachs, Armenians, Italians, Scots, and the Dutch (Olędrzy), who were either categorised as merchants, settlers or refugees fleeing religious persecution.

Prior to the union with Lithuania, the Kingdom of Poland was much more homogenous; approximately 70% of the population was Polish and Roman Catholic. With the creation of the Commonwealth, the number of Poles in comparison to the total population decreased to 50%. In 1569, the population stood at 7 million, with roughly 4.5 million Poles, 750,000 Lithuanians, 700,000 Jews and 2 million Ruthenians. Historians Michał Kopczyński and Wojciech Tygielski suggest that with the territorial expansion after the Truce of Deulino in 1618, the Commonwealth's population reached 12 million people, of which Poles constituted only 40%. At that time the nobility made up 10% of the entire population and the burghers around 15%. The average population density per square kilometer was: 24 in Mazovia, 23 in Lesser Poland, 19 in Greater Poland, 12 in Lublin palatinate, 10 in the Lwów area, 7 in Podolia and Volhynia, and 3 in the Kiev Voivodeship. There was a tendency for the people from the more densely inhabited western territories to migrate eastwards.

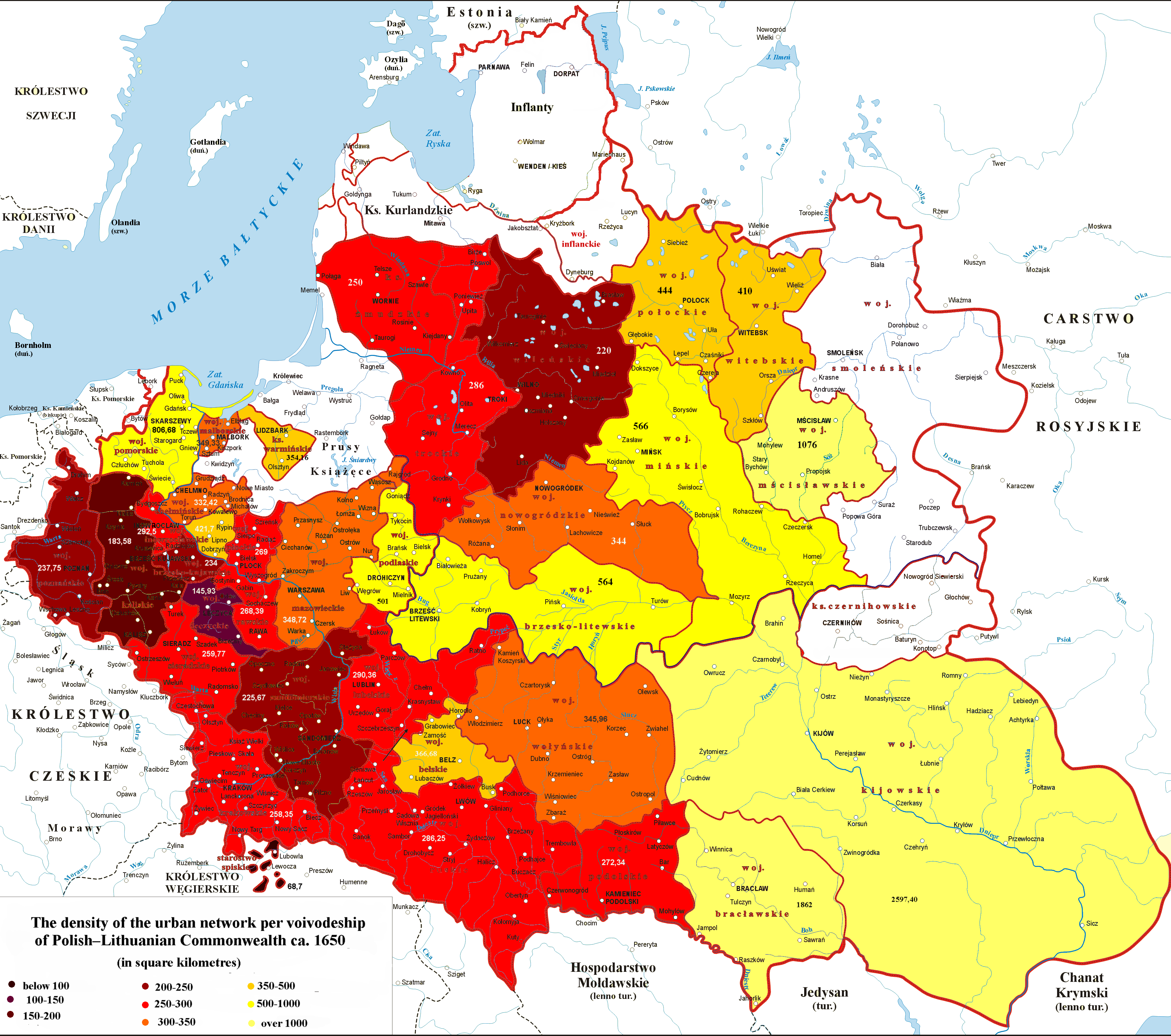
Density of urban network of the Commonwealth per each voivodeship in 1650

A sudden change in the country's demographics occurred in the mid-17th century. The Second Northern War and the Deluge followed by famine in the period from 1648 to 1657 were accountable for at least 4 million deaths. Coupled with further territorial losses, by 1717 the population had fallen to 9 million. The population slowly recovered throughout the 18th century; just before the first partition of Poland in 1772, the Commonwealth's population was 14 million, including around 1 million nobles. In 1792, the population of Poland was around 11 million and included 750,000 nobles.

The most multicultural and robust city in the country was Gdańsk, a major Hanseatic seaport on the Baltic and Poland's wealthiest region. Gdańsk at the time was inhabited by a German-speaking majority and further hosted large numbers of foreign merchants, particularly of Scottish, Dutch or Scandinavian extraction. Historically, the Grand Duchy of Lithuania was more diverse than the Kingdom of Poland, and was deemed a melting pot of many cultures and religions. Hence, the inhabitants of the Grand Duchy were collectively known as Litvins regardless of their nationality, with the exception of Jews residing in Lithuania who were called Litvaks.

Despite guaranteed religious tolerance, gradual Polonization and Counter-Reformation sought to minimise the Commonwealth's diversity; the aim was to root out some minorities by imposing the Polish language, Latin, Polish culture and the Roman Catholic religion where possible. By the late 18th century, the Lithuanian language, culture and identity became vulnerable; the country's name was changed to "Commonwealth of Poland" in 1791.

=== Religion ===
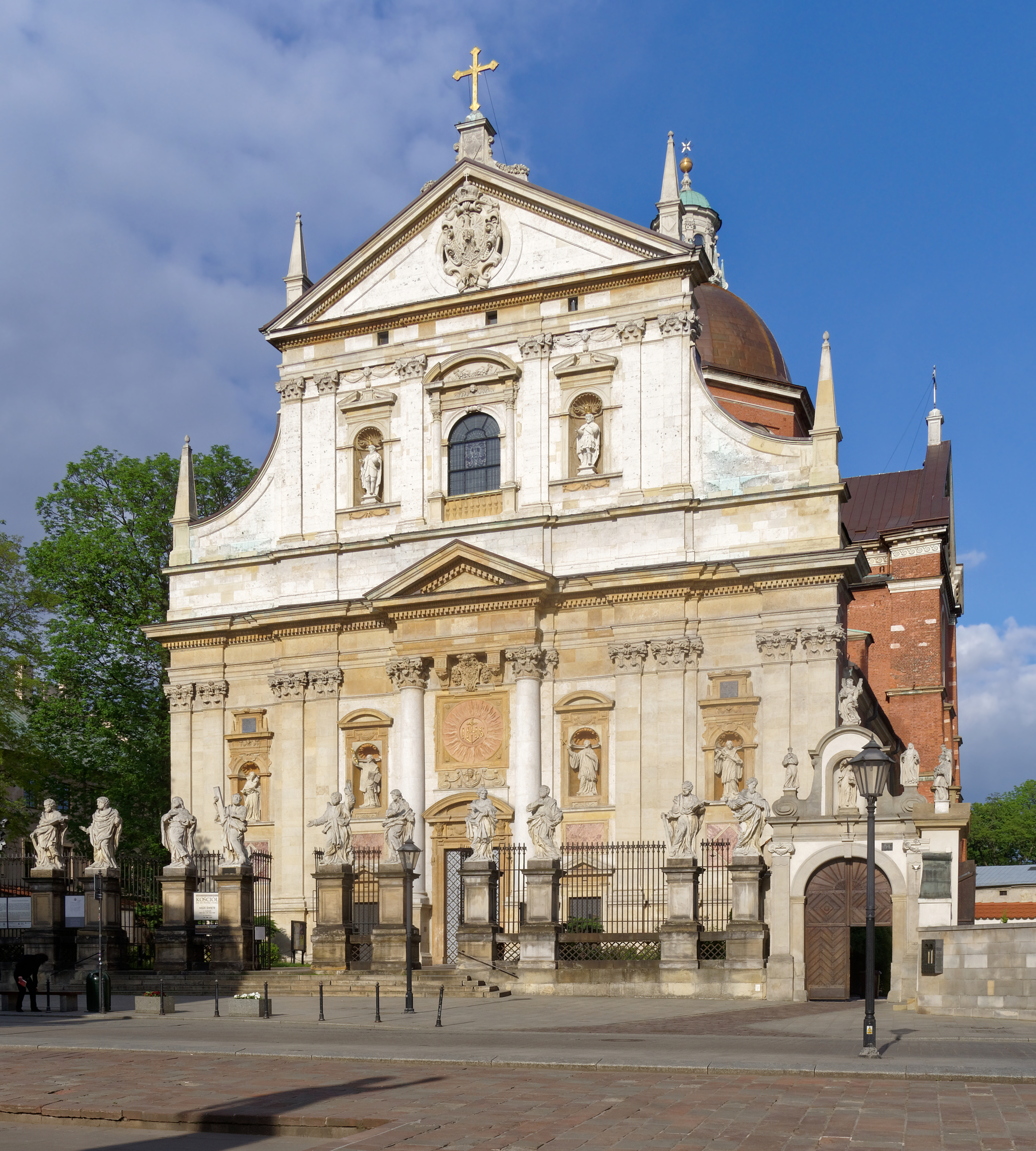
Saints Peter and Paul Church in Kraków was built between 1597 and 1619 by the Jesuit order

The Warsaw Confederation signed on 28 January 1573 secured the rights of minorities and religions; it allowed all persons to practice any faith freely, though religious tolerance varied at times. As outlined by Norman Davies, "the wording and substance of the declaration of the Confederation of Warsaw of were extraordinary with regards to prevailing conditions elsewhere in Europe; and they governed the principles of religious life in the Republic for over two hundred years." Subsequently, the Catholic church initiated a Counter-Reformation in Poland, relying heavily on methods of persuasion and legal means. As a result, compared to many other European countries, the conflict between the Catholics and the Protestants in Poland was relatively peaceful.

Poland retained religious freedom laws during an era when religious persecution was an everyday occurrence in the rest of Europe. The Polish–Lithuanian Commonwealth was a place where the most radical religious sects, trying to escape persecution in other countries of the Christian world, sought refuge. In 1561 Giovanni Bernardino Bonifacio d'Oria, a religious exile living in Poland, wrote of his adopted country's virtues to a colleague back in Italy: "You could live here in accordance with your ideas and preferences, in great, even the greatest freedoms, including writing and publishing. No one is a censor here." Others, particularly the leaders of the Roman Catholic church, the Jesuits and papal legates, were less optimistic about Poland's religious frivolity.

"This country became a place of shelter for heretics" – Cardinal Stanislaus Hosius, papal legate to Poland.

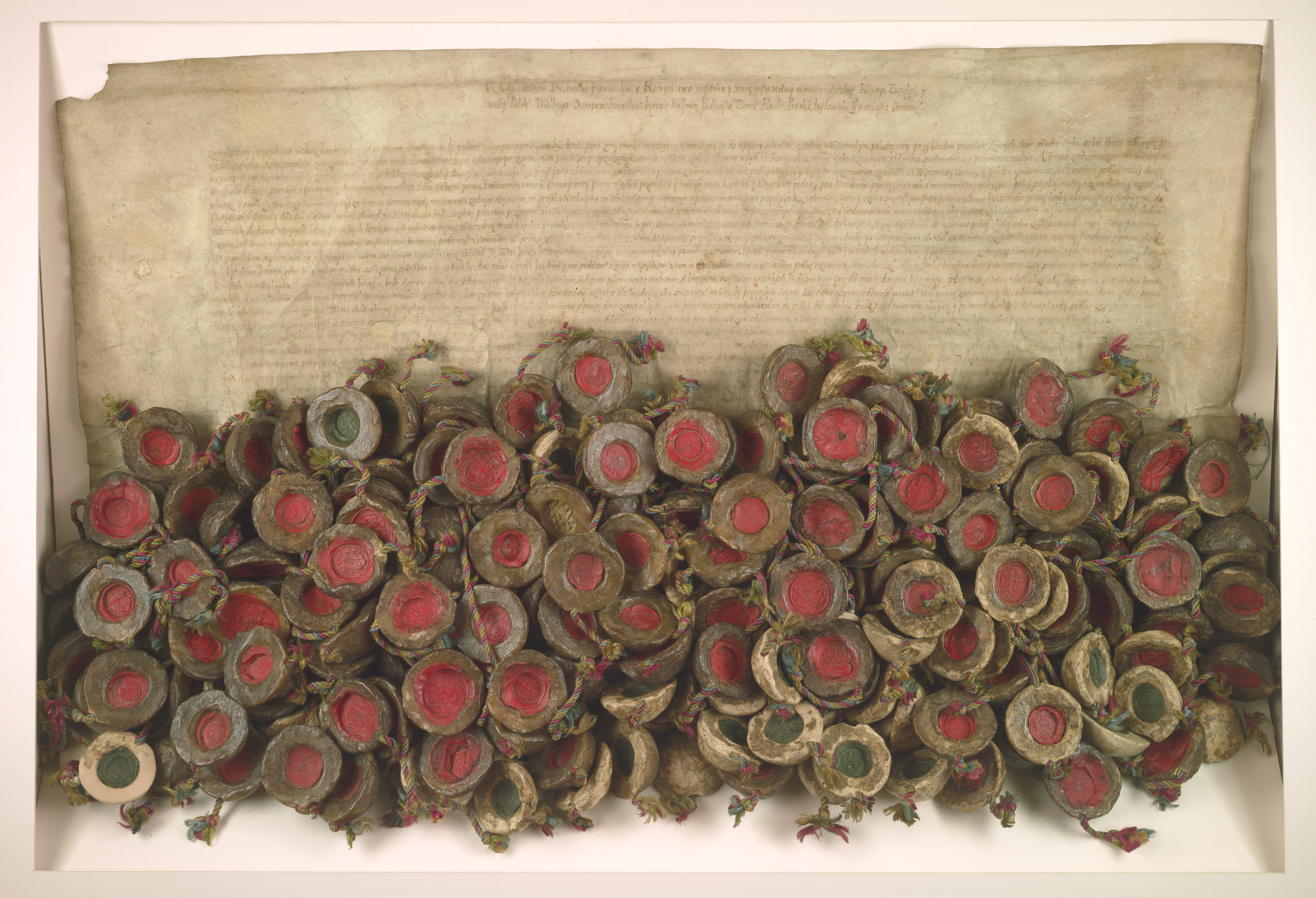
Original act of the Warsaw Confederation in 1573, the first act of religious freedom in Europe

To be Polish, in remote and multi-ethnic parts of the Commonwealth, was then much less an index of ethnicity than of religion and rank; it was a designation largely reserved for the landed noble class (szlachta), which included Poles, but also many members of non-Polish origin who converted to Catholicism in increasing numbers with each following generation. For the non-Polish noble such conversion meant a final step of Polonization that followed the adoption of the Polish language and culture. Poland, as the culturally most advanced part of the Commonwealth, with the royal court, the capital, the largest cities, the second-oldest university in Central Europe (after Prague), and the more liberal and democratic social institutions had proven an irresistible magnet for the non-Polish nobility in the Commonwealth. Many referred to themselves as "gente Ruthenus, natione Polonus" (Ruthenian by blood, Polish by nationality) since the 16th century onwards.

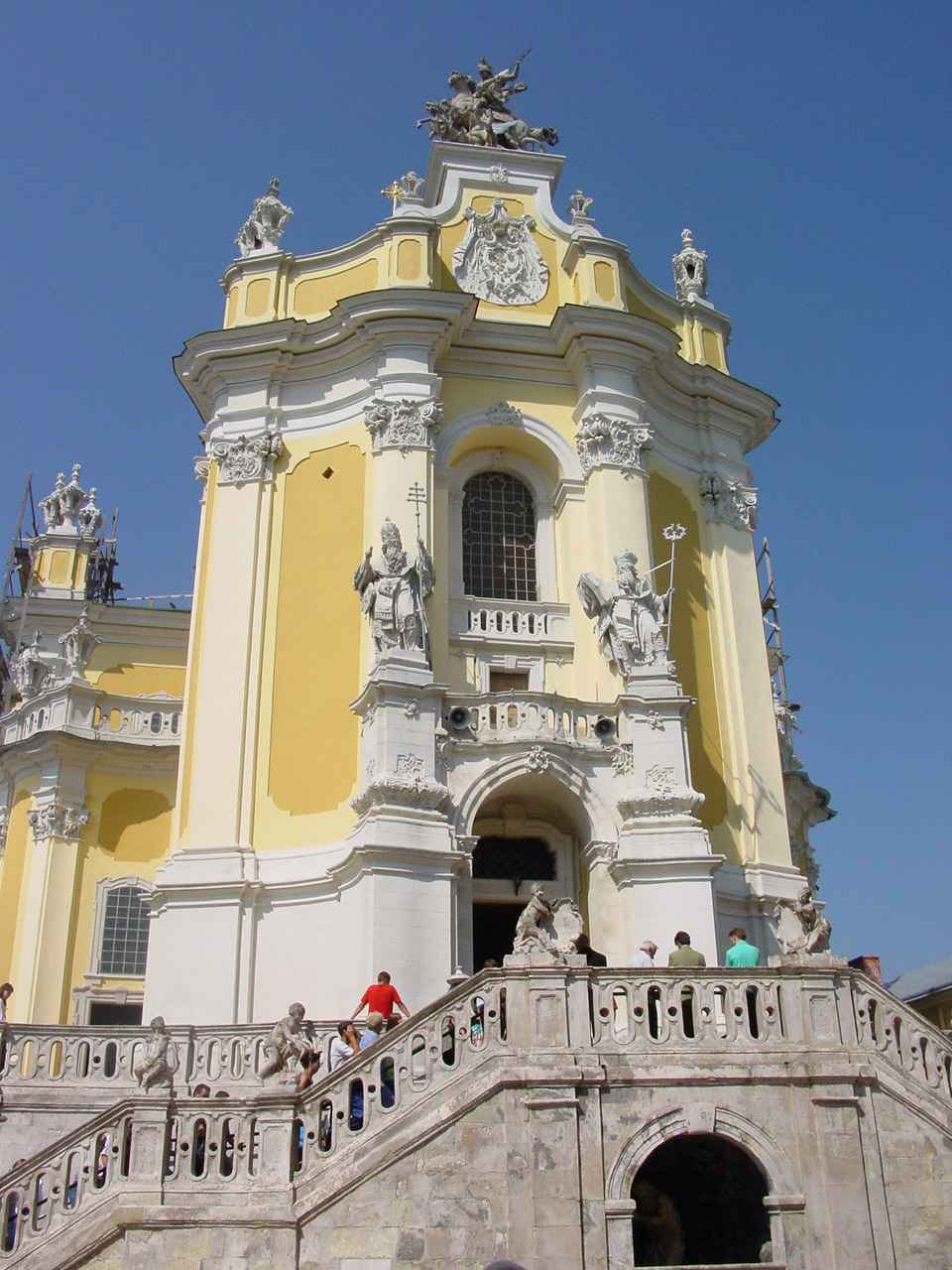
The Greek-Catholic St. George's Cathedral in Lwów was constructed between 1746 and 1762 following the Act of Unification of the Lwów archeparchy with the Holy See.

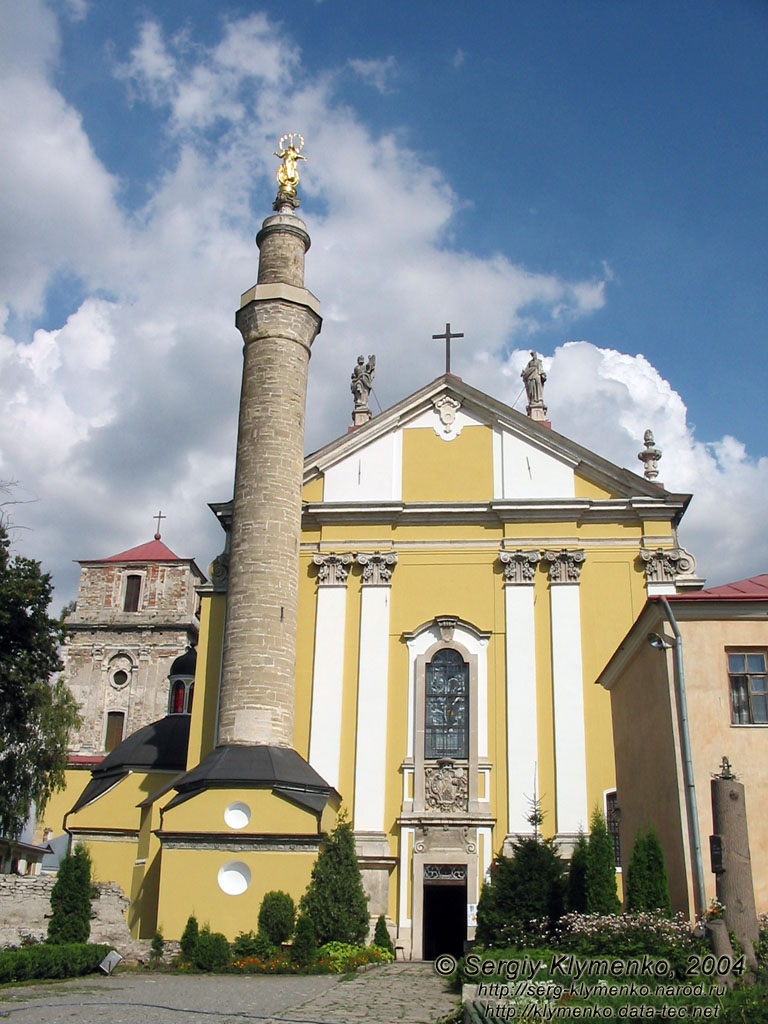
The church in Kamieniec Podolski was converted into a mosque during the Turkish occupation between 1672 and 1699, with the 33-meter minaret being added at that time.

As a result, in the eastern territories a Polish (or Polonised) aristocracy dominated a peasantry whose great majority was neither Polish nor Catholic. Moreover, the decades of peace brought huge colonization efforts to the eastern territories (nowadays roughly western and central Ukraine), heightening the tensions among nobles, Jews, Cossacks (traditionally Orthodox), Polish and Ruthenian peasants. When the latter, deprived of their native protectors among the Ruthenian nobility, turned for protection to cossacks that facilitated violence which in the end broke the Commonwealth. The tensions were aggravated by conflicts between Eastern Orthodoxy and the Greek Catholic Church following the Union of Brest, overall discrimination of Orthodox religions by dominant Catholicism, and several Cossack uprisings. In the west and north, many cities had sizable German minorities, often belonging to Lutheran or Reformed churches. The Commonwealth had also one of the largest Jewish diasporas in the world – by the mid-16th century 80% of the world's Jews lived in Poland (Pic. 16).

Until the Reformation, the szlachta were mostly Catholics (Pic. 13). However, many noble families quickly adopted the Reformed religion. After the Counter-Reformation, when the Catholic Church regained power in Poland, the szlachta became almost exclusively Catholic.

The Crown had about double the population of Lithuania and five times the income of the latter's treasury. As with other countries, the borders, area and population of the Commonwealth varied over time. After the Peace of Jam Zapolski (1582), the Commonwealth had approximately 815,000 km^{2} area and a population of 7.5 million. After the Truce of Deulino (1618), the Commonwealth had an area of some 990,000 km^{2} and a population of 11–12 million (including some 4 million Poles and close to a million Lithuanians).

=== Languages ===
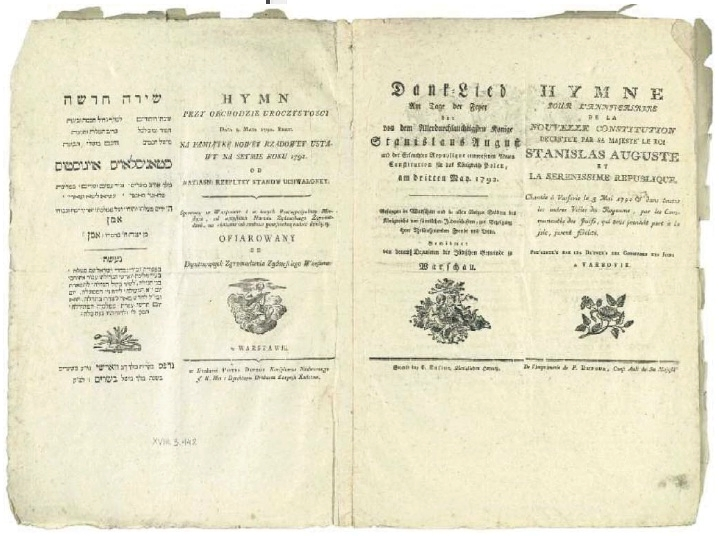
First anniversary anthem of the Constitution of 3 May 1791 (1792) in Hebrew, Polish, German and French

- Polish – officially recognised; dominant language, used by most of the Commonwealth's nobility and by the peasantry in the Crown province; official language in the Crown chancellery and since 1697 in the Grand Duchy chancellery. Dominant language in the towns.
- Latin – officially recognised; commonly used in foreign relations and popular as a second language among some of the nobility.
- French – not officially recognised; replaced Latin at the royal court in Warsaw in the beginning of the 18th century as a language used in foreign relations and as genuine spoken language. It was commonly used as a language of science and literature and as a second language among some of the nobility.
- Ruthenian – also known as Chancellery Slavonic; officially recognised; official language in the Grand Duchy chancellery until 1697 (when replaced by Polish) and in Bratslav, Chernihiv, Kiev and Volhynian voivodeships until 1673; used in some foreign relations its dialects (modern Belarusian and Ukrainian) were widely used in the Grand Duchy and eastern parts of the Crown as spoken language.
- Lithuanian – not officially recognised; but used in some official documents in the Grand Duchy and, mostly, used as a spoken language in the northernmost part of the country (in Lithuania Proper) and the northern part of Ducal Prussia (Polish fief).
- German – officially recognised; used in some foreign relations, in Ducal Prussia and by German minorities especially in the Royal Prussia and Greater Poland.
- Hebrew – officially recognised; and Aramaic used by Jews for religious, scholarly, and legal matters.
- Yiddish – not officially recognised; used by Jews in their daily life.
- Italian – not officially recognised; used in some foreign relations and by Italian minorities in cities.
- Armenian – officially recognised; used by the Armenian minority.
- Arabic – not officially recognized; used in some foreign relations and by Tatars in their religious matters, they also wrote Ruthenian in the Arabic script.

== Legacy ==
The Duchy of Warsaw, was established in 1807 by Napoleon Bonaparte, traced its origins to the Commonwealth. Other revival movements appeared during the November Uprising (1830–31), the January Uprising (1863–64) and in the 1920s, with Józef Piłsudski's failed attempt to create a Polish-led Intermarium (Międzymorze) federation that, at its largest extent, would span from Finland in the north to the Balkans in the south. The contemporary Republic of Poland considers itself a successor to the Commonwealth, whereas the Republic of Lithuania, which was re-established at the end of World War I and the Council of Lithuania in the Act of Independence of Lithuania declared that it separated Lithuania from all state ties that had previously existed with other nations, saw the participation of the Lithuanian state in the old Polish–Lithuanian Commonwealth mostly in a negative light at the early stages of regaining its independence, although this attitude has been changing in recent years.

== Administrative divisions ==
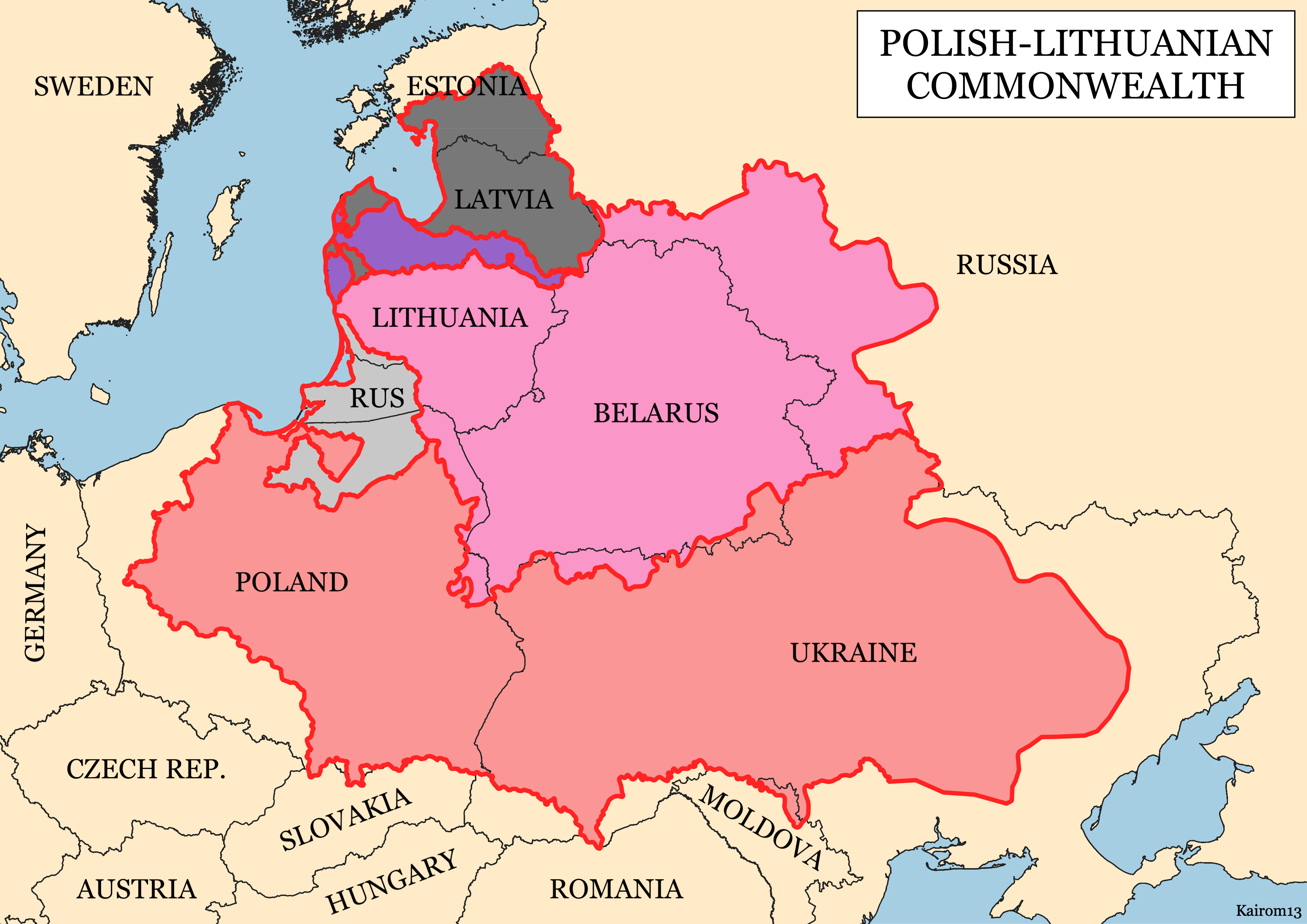
Outline of the Polish–Lithuanian Commonwealth with its major subdivisions after the 1618 Truce of Deulino, superimposed on present-day national borders. Crown of the Kingdom of Poland Grand Duchy of Lithuania Duchy of Livonia Duchy of Prussia, Polish fief Duchy of Courland and Semigallia, Commonwealth fief

While the term "Poland" was also commonly used to denote this whole polity, Poland was in fact only part of a greater whole – the Polish–Lithuanian Commonwealth, which comprised primarily two parts:

- the Crown of the Polish Kingdom (Poland proper), colloquially "the Crown"
- the Grand Duchy of Lithuania, colloquially "Lithuania"

The Commonwealth was further divided into smaller administrative units known as voivodeships (województwa). Each voivodeship was governed by a Voivode (wojewoda, governor). Voivodeships were further divided into powiats, each powiat being governed by a starosta.

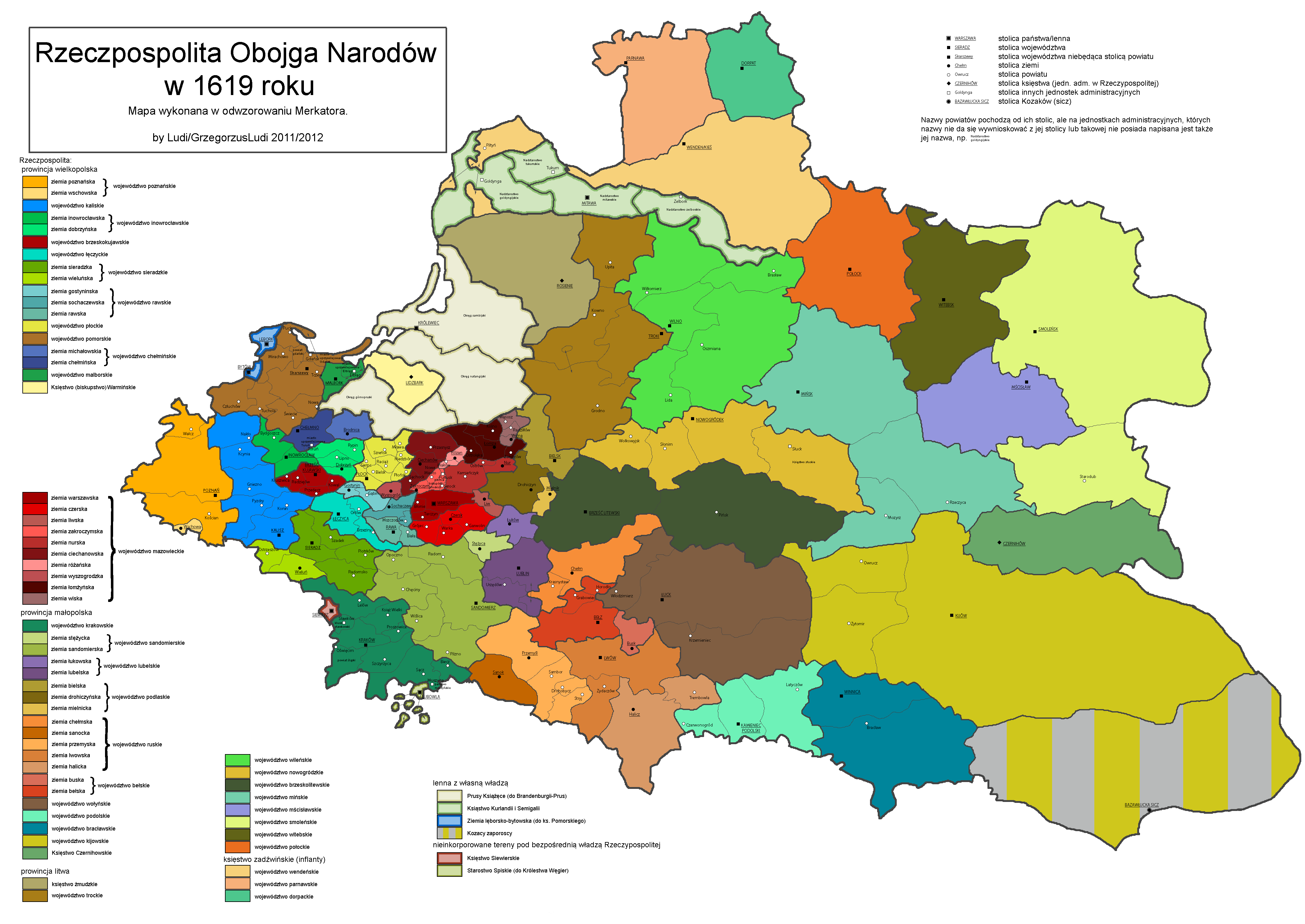
Map of powiats of Polish-Lithuanian Commonwealth

Cities were governed by castellans. There were frequent exceptions to these rules, often involving the ziemia subunit of administration.

The lands that once belonged to the Commonwealth are now largely distributed among several Central and East European countries: Poland, Ukraine, Moldova (Transnistria), Belarus, Russia, Lithuania, Latvia, and Estonia. Also some small towns in Upper Hungary (today mostly Slovakia), became a part of Poland in the Treaty of Lubowla (Spiš towns).

Other notable parts of the Commonwealth, without respect to region or voivodeship divisions, include:

- Lesser Poland Province (Polish: Małopolska), southern Poland, with two largest cities, its capital at Kraków and Lublin in the north-east;
- Greater Poland Province (Polish: Wielkopolska), west–central Poland around Poznań and the Warta River system;
- Mazovia (Polish: Mazowsze), central Poland, with its capital at Warsaw;
- Lithuania Proper (Lithuanian: Didžioji Lietuva), northwest Grand Duchy, its most Catholic and ethnically Lithuanian part, capital Vilnius;
- Duchy of Samogitia (Lithuanian: Žemaitija; Polish: Żmudź), westernmost and most autonomous part of Grand Duchy of Lithuania, also the western part of Lithuania Proper, capital Raseiniai;
- Royal Prussia (Polish: Prusy Królewskie), at the southern shore of the Baltic Sea, was an autonomous area since the Second Peace of Thorn (1466), incorporated into the Crown in 1569 with the Commonwealth's formation;
  - Pomerelia (Polish: Pomorze Gdańskie), Pomerania around Gdańsk, western part of Royal Prussia;
- Ruthenia (Polish: Ruś), the eastern Commonwealth, adjoining Russia;
- Duchy of Livonia (Inflanty), a joint domain of the Crown and the Grand Duchy of Lithuania. Parts lost to Sweden in the 1620s and in 1660;
- Duchy of Courland and Semigallia (Lithuanian: Kuršas ir Žiemgala; Polish: Kurlandia i Semigalia), a northern fief of the Commonwealth. It established a colony in Tobago in 1637 and on St. Andrews Island at the Gambia River in 1651 (see Couronian colonization);
- Silesia (Polish: Śląsk) was not within the Commonwealth, but small parts belonged to various Commonwealth kings; in particular, the Vasa kings were dukes of Opole (Oppeln), Prudnik (Neustadt) and Racibórz (Ratibor) from 1645 to 1666.

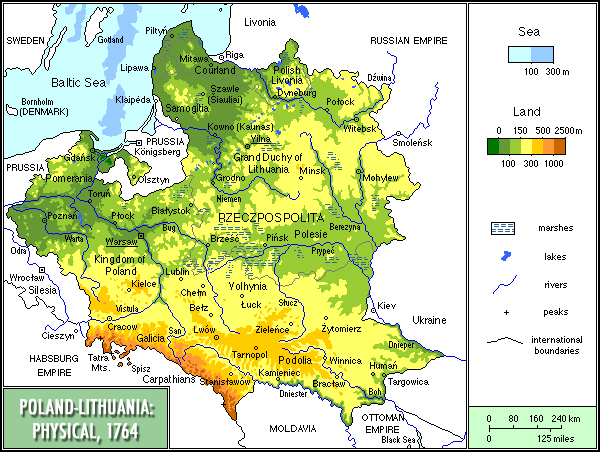
Topographical map of the Commonwealth in 1764

Commonwealth borders shifted with wars and treaties, sometimes several times in a decade, especially in the eastern and southern parts. After the Peace of Jam Zapolski (1582), the Commonwealth had approximately 815,000 km^{2} area and a population of 7.5 million. After the Truce of Deulino (1618), the Commonwealth had an area of some 1 million km^{2} (990,000 km^{2}) and a population of about 11 million.

== Geography ==
In the 16th century, the Polish bishop and cartographer Martin Kromer, who studied in Bologna, published a Latin atlas, entitled Poland: about Its Location, People, Culture, Offices and the Polish Commonwealth, which was regarded as one of the most comprehensive guides to the country.

Kromer's works and other contemporary maps, such as those of Gerardus Mercator, show the Commonwealth as mostly plains. The Commonwealth's southeastern part, the Kresy, was famous for its steppes. The Carpathian Mountains formed part of the southern border, with the Tatra Mountain chain the highest, and the Baltic Sea formed the Commonwealth's northern border. As with most European countries at the time, the Commonwealth had extensive forest cover, especially in the east. Today, what remains of the Białowieża Forest constitutes the last largely intact primeval forest in Europe.

== Image gallery ==
Politics and economy

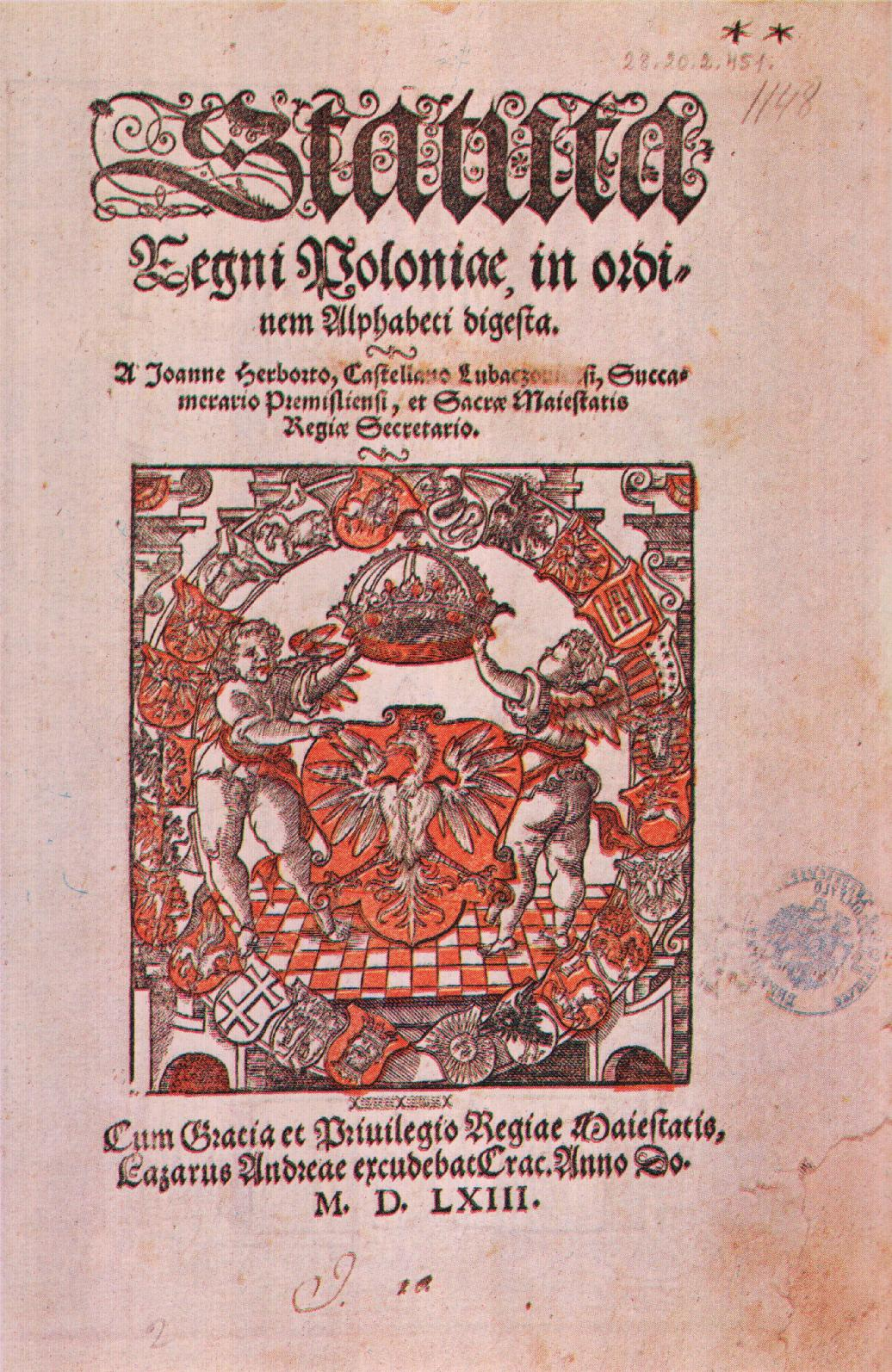
Statuta Regni Poloniae in ordinem alphabeti digesta (Statutes of the Polish Kingdom, Arranged in Alphabetical Order), 1563

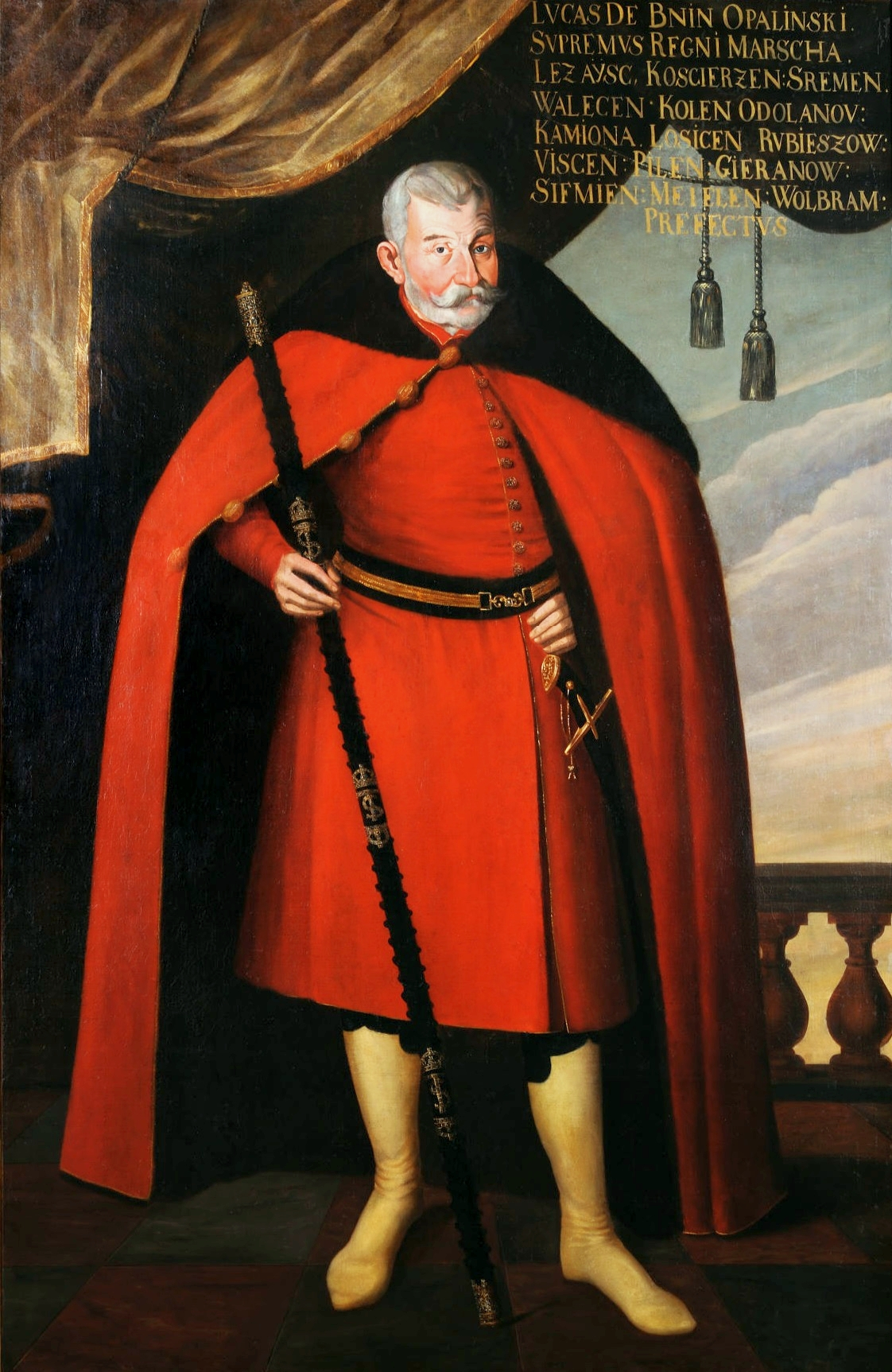
Grand Marshal of the Crown Łukasz Opaliński portraited with the insignium of his power in the parliament – the Marshal's cane, 1640

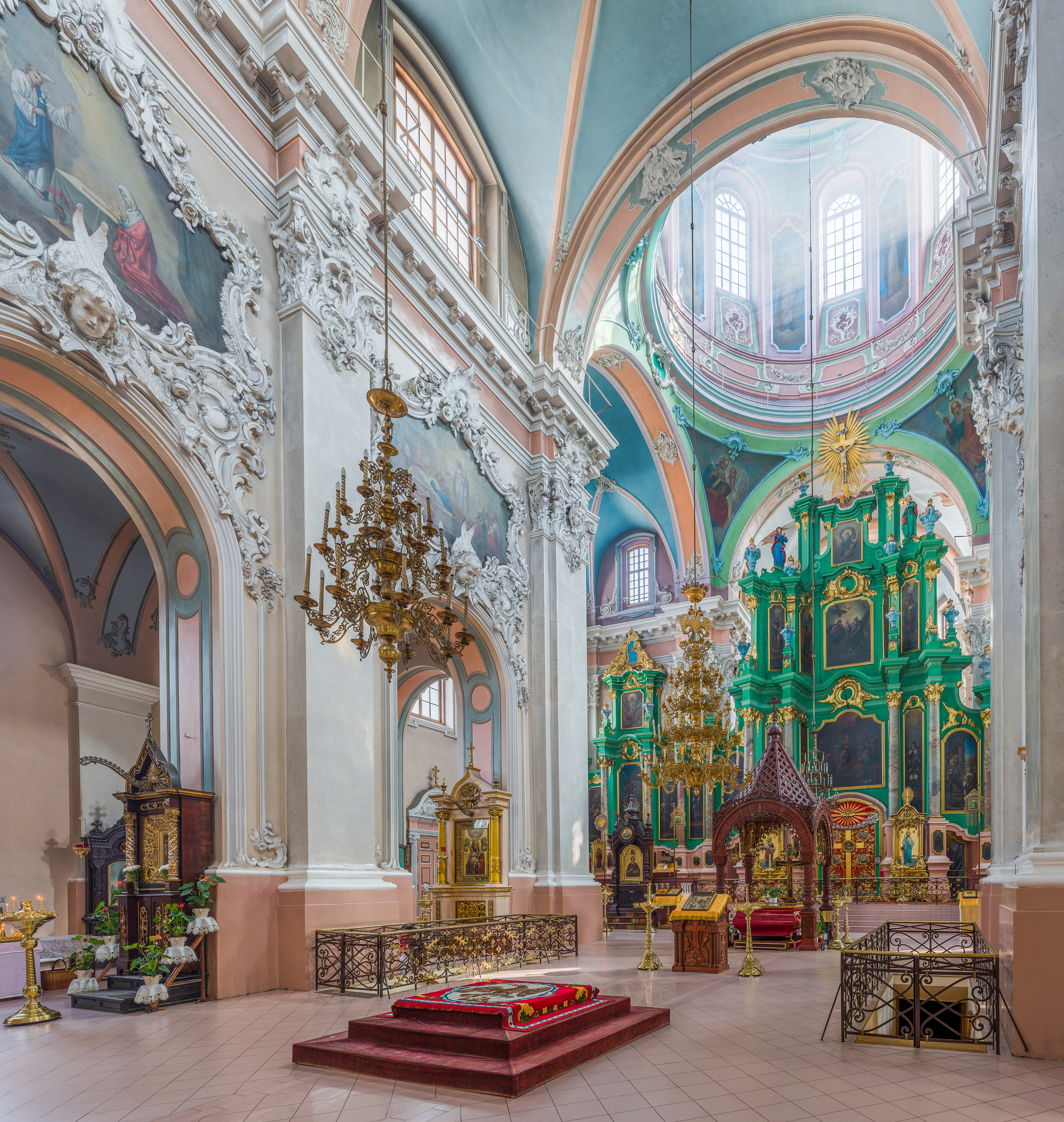
Rococo iconostasis in the Orthodox Church of the Holy Spirit in Vilnius, designed by Johann Christoph Glaubitz, 1753–1756

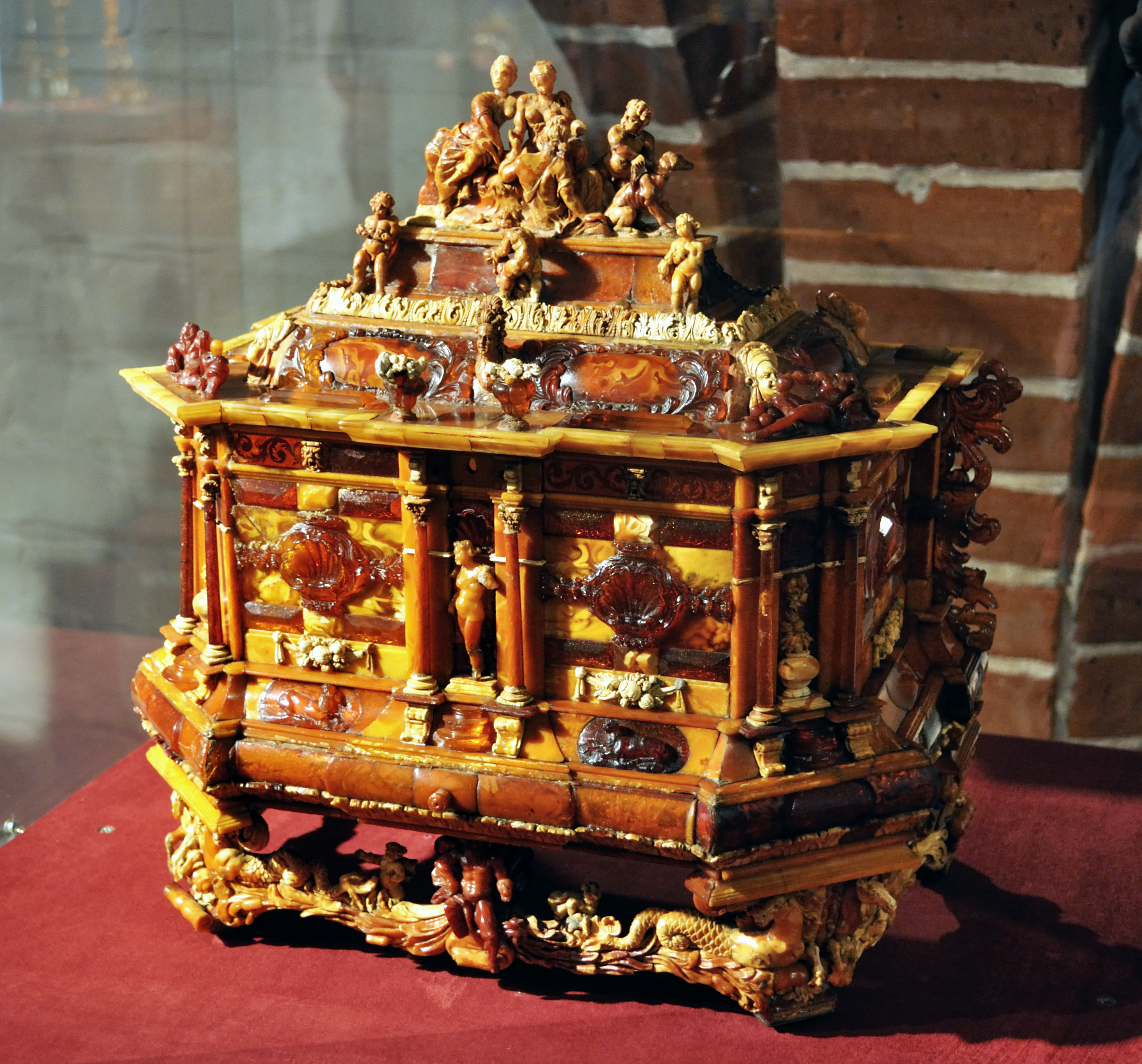
18th century amber casket. Gdańsk patronised by the Polish court flourished as the center for amber working in the 17th century.

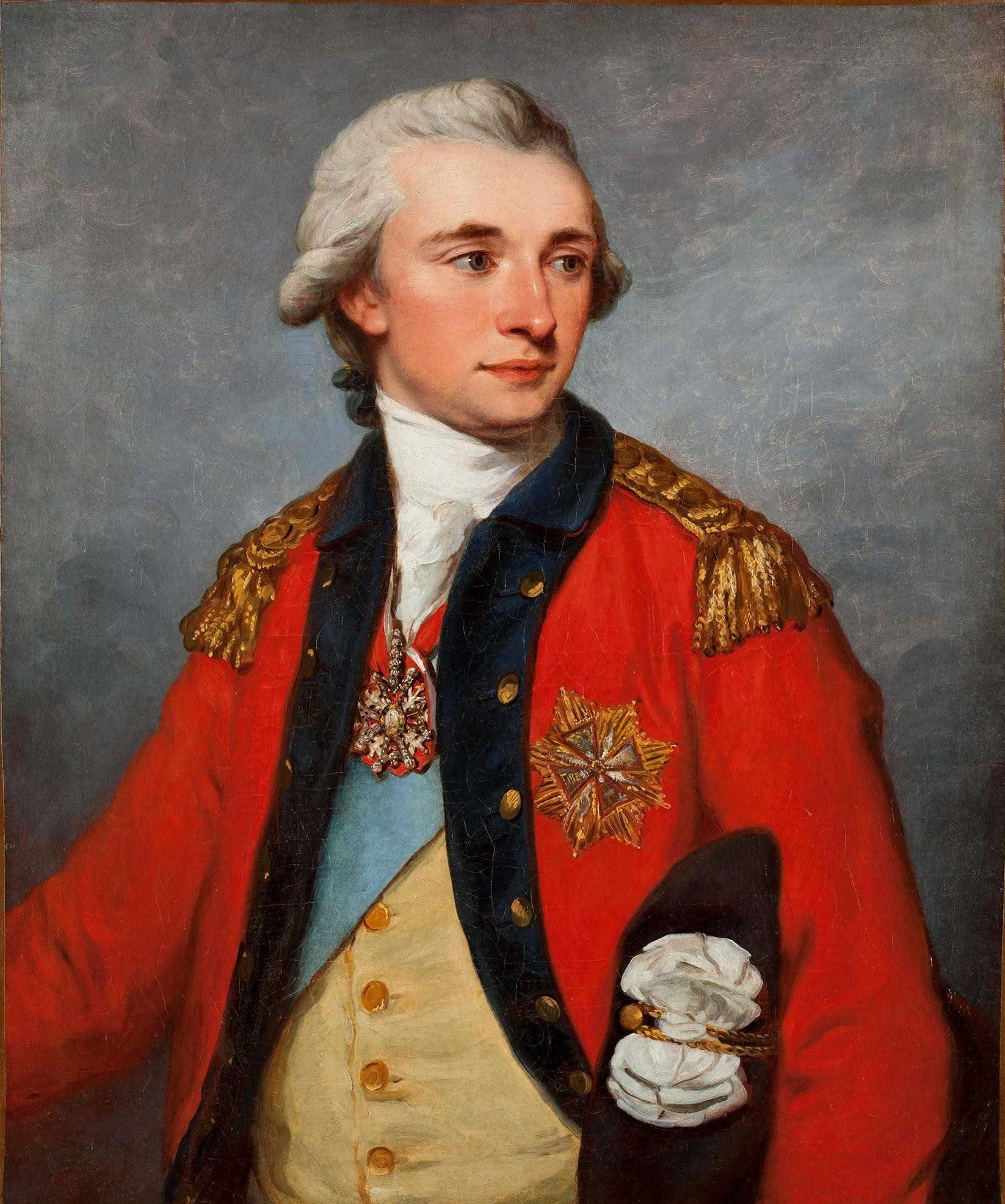
Stanisław Poniatowski, Commander of the Royal Guards and Grand Treasurer of Lithuania. Painted by Angelika Kauffmann in 1786.

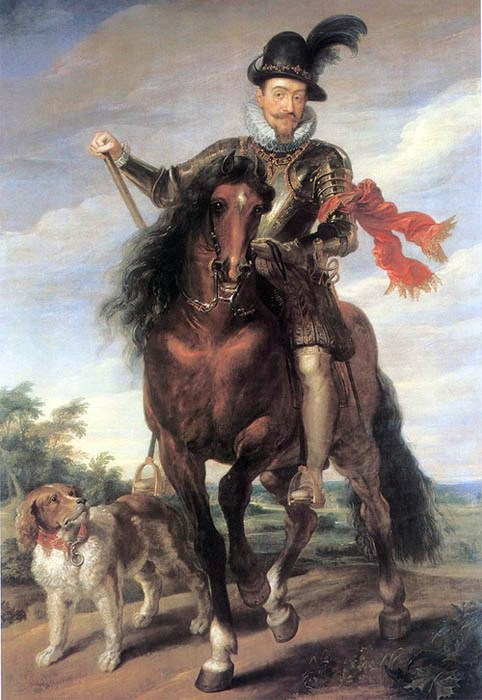
Equestrian portrait of King Sigismund III of Poland, by Peter Paul Rubens, 1624

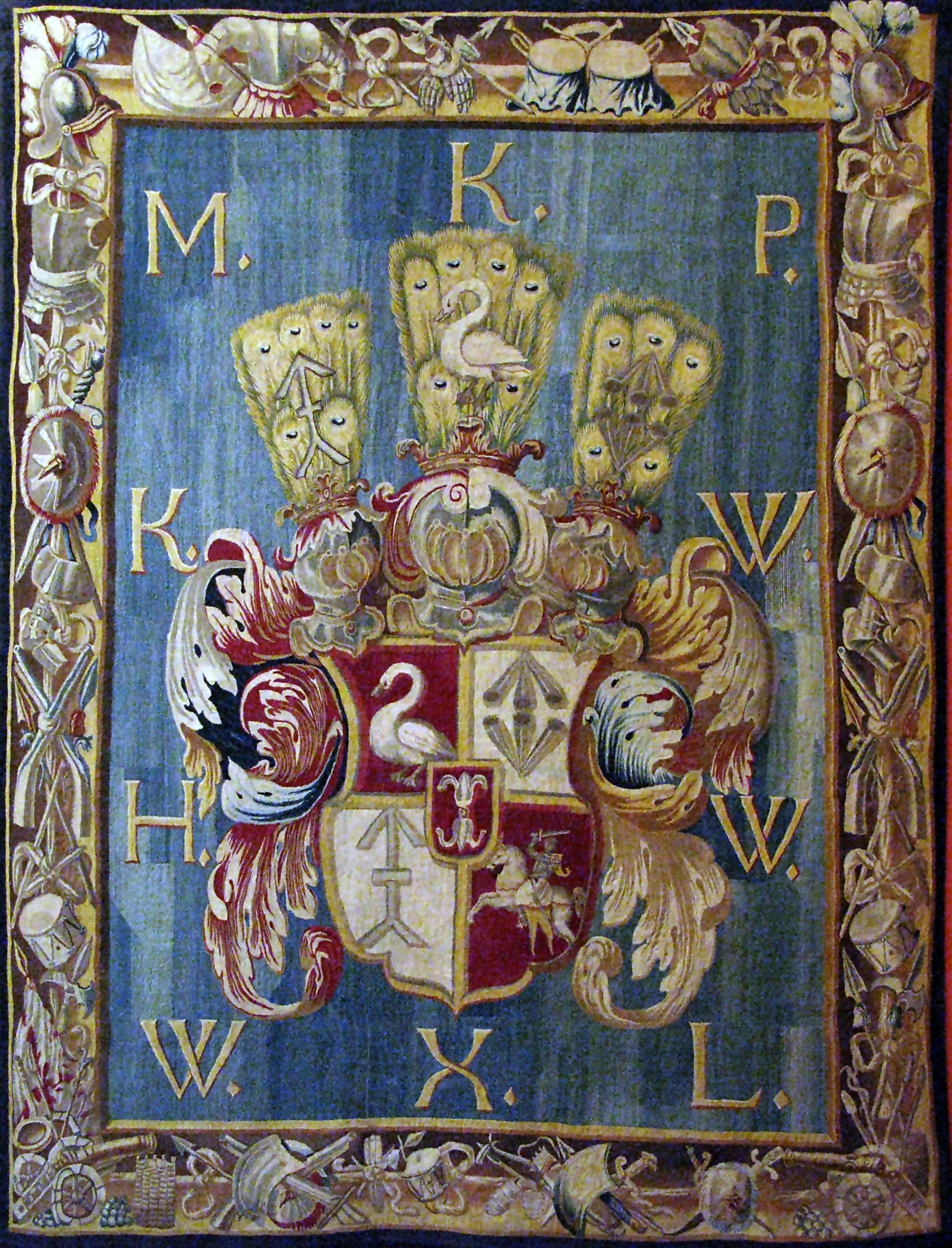
Tapestry with the arms of Michał Kazimierz Pac, Jan Leyniers, Brussels, 1667–1669

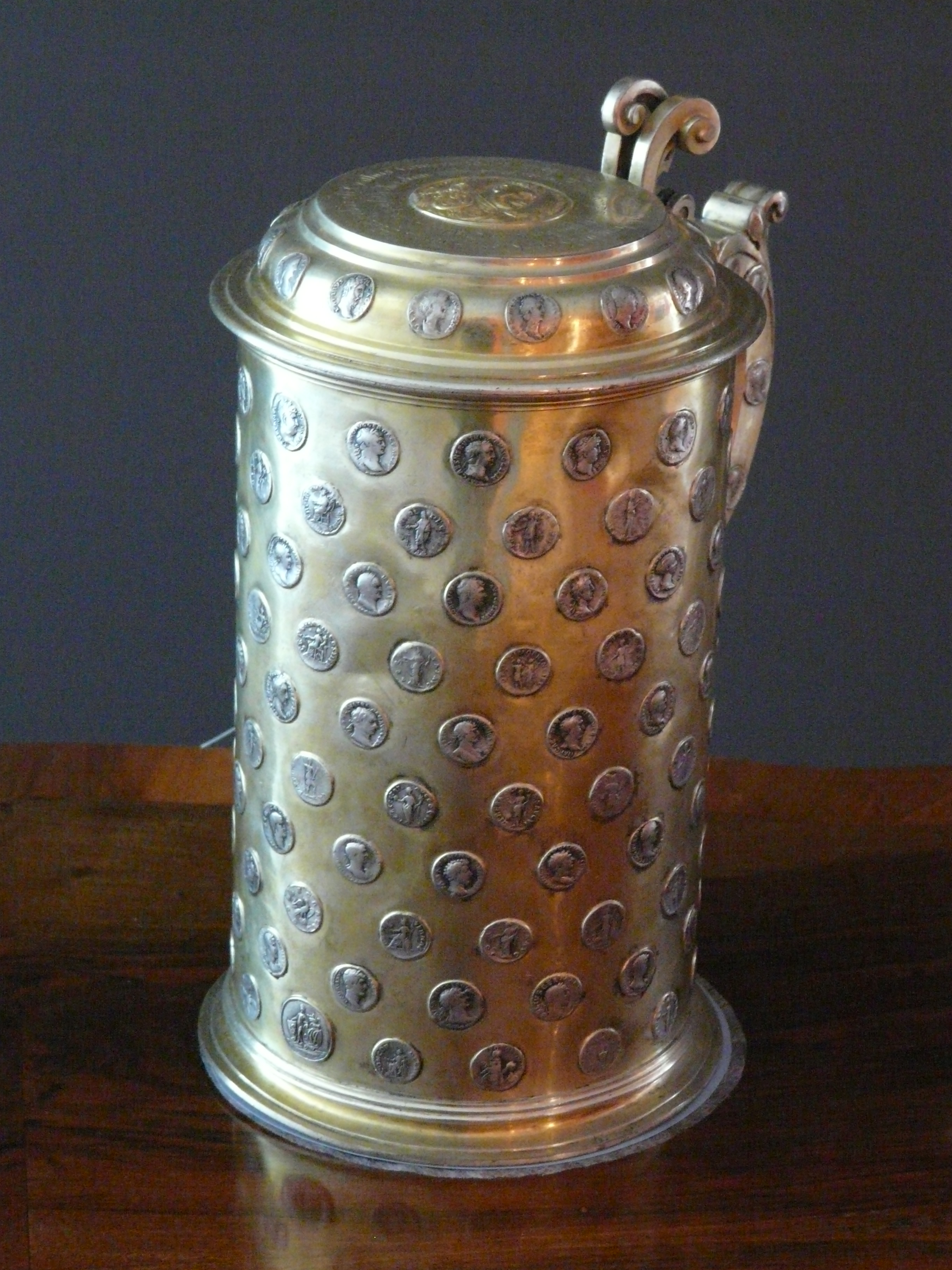
Silver tankard by Józef Ceypler, Kraków, 1739–1745

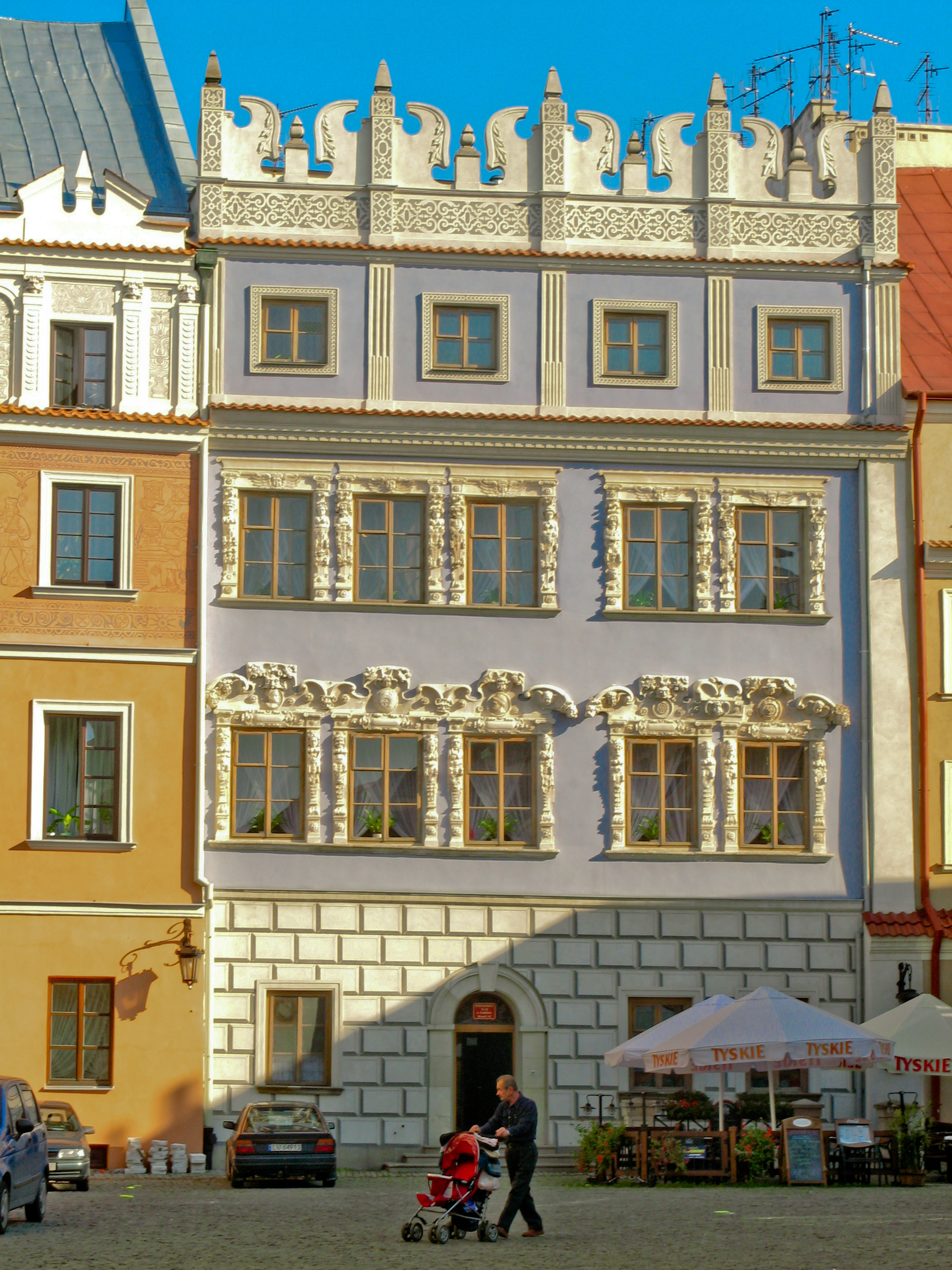
Example of the merchant architecture: Konopnica's tenement house in Lublin, 1575

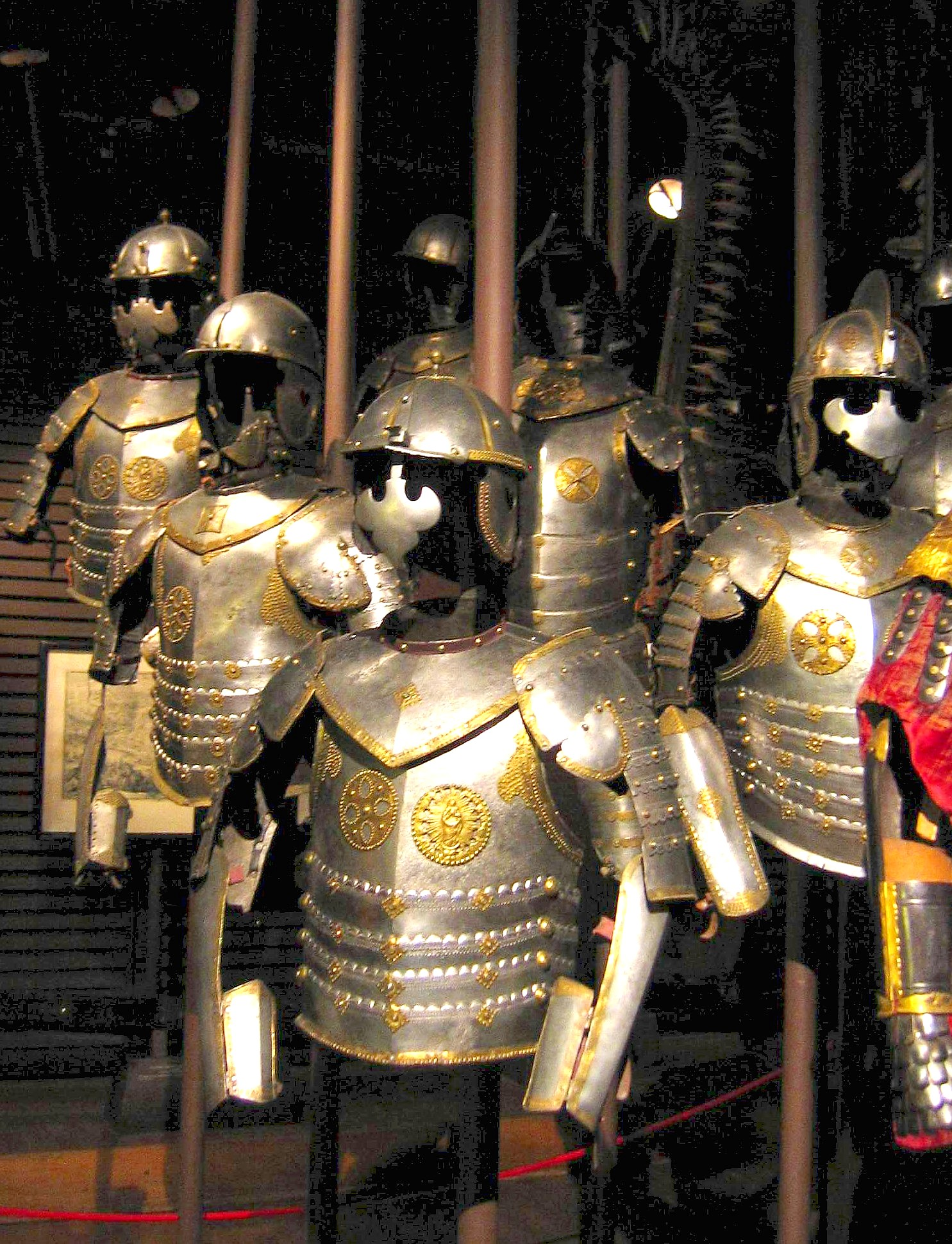
Hussars' armours, first half of the 17th century
Science, art and architecture

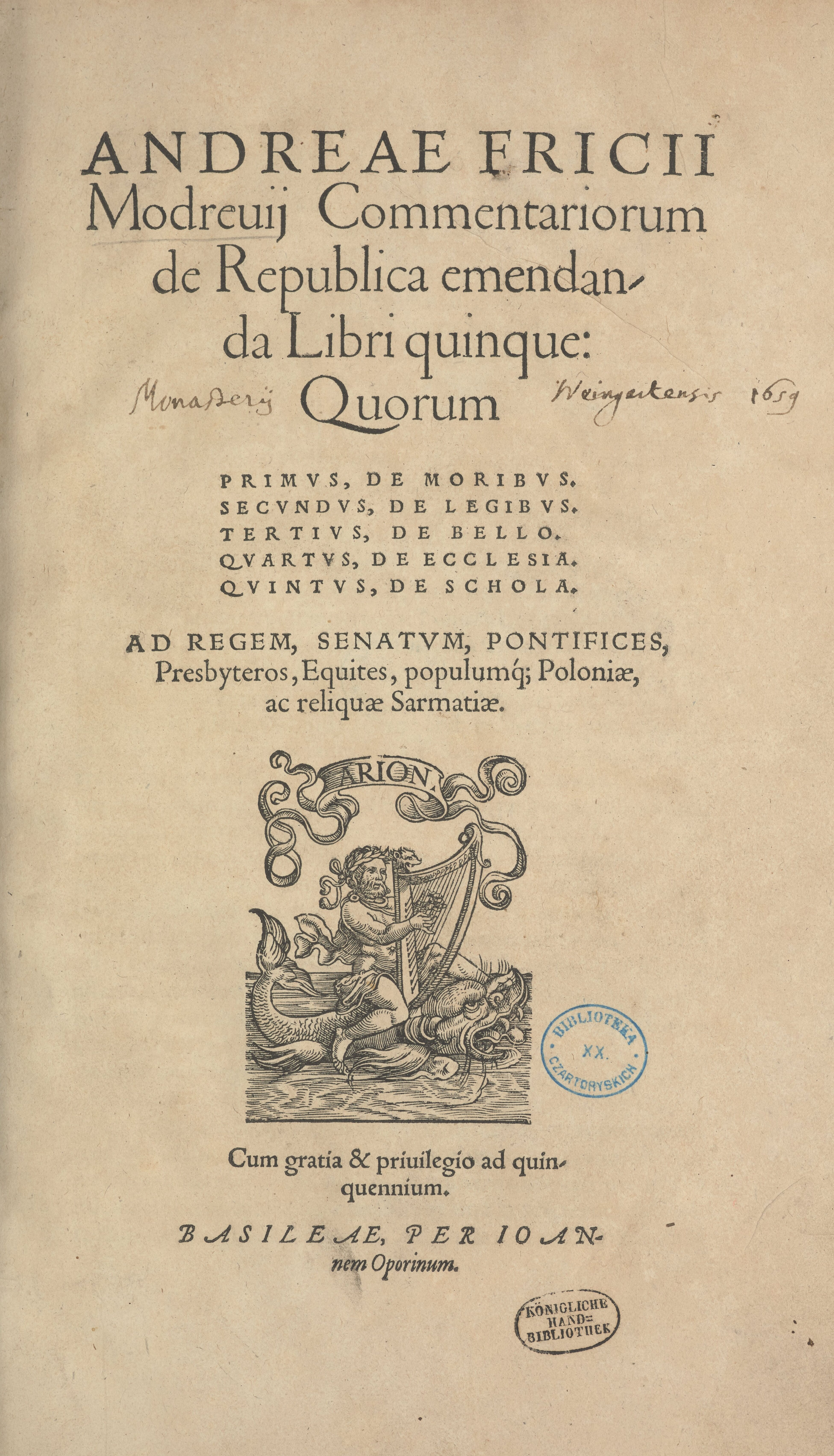
De republica emendanda (1554) by Andrzej Frycz Modrzewski, proposed a deep programme of reforms of the state, society and church.

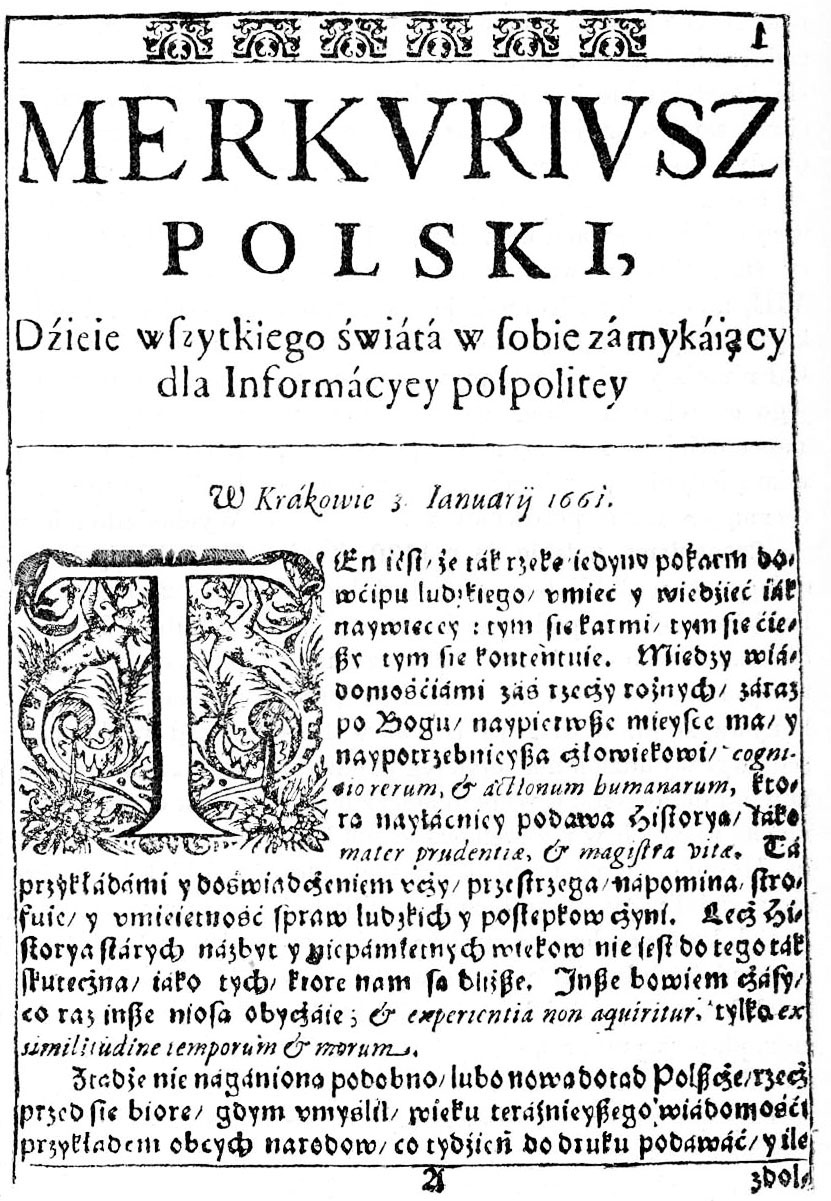
Merkuriusz Polski Ordynaryjny, the first Polish newspaper published on the orders of Queen Marie Louise Gonzaga in 1661

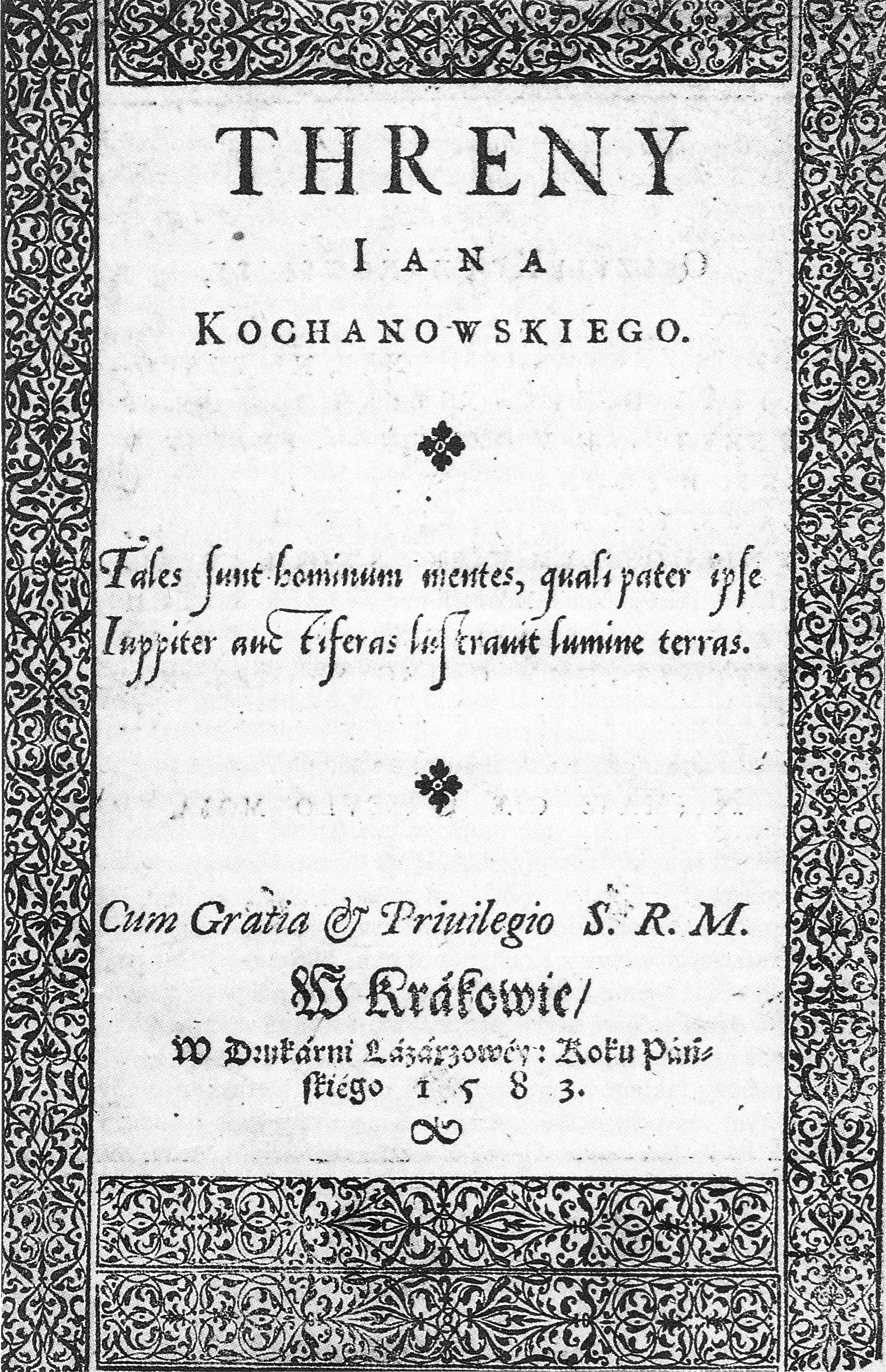
Title page of Treny (1580) by Jan Kochanowski, a series of elegies upon the death of his beloved daughter, is an acknowledged masterpiece.

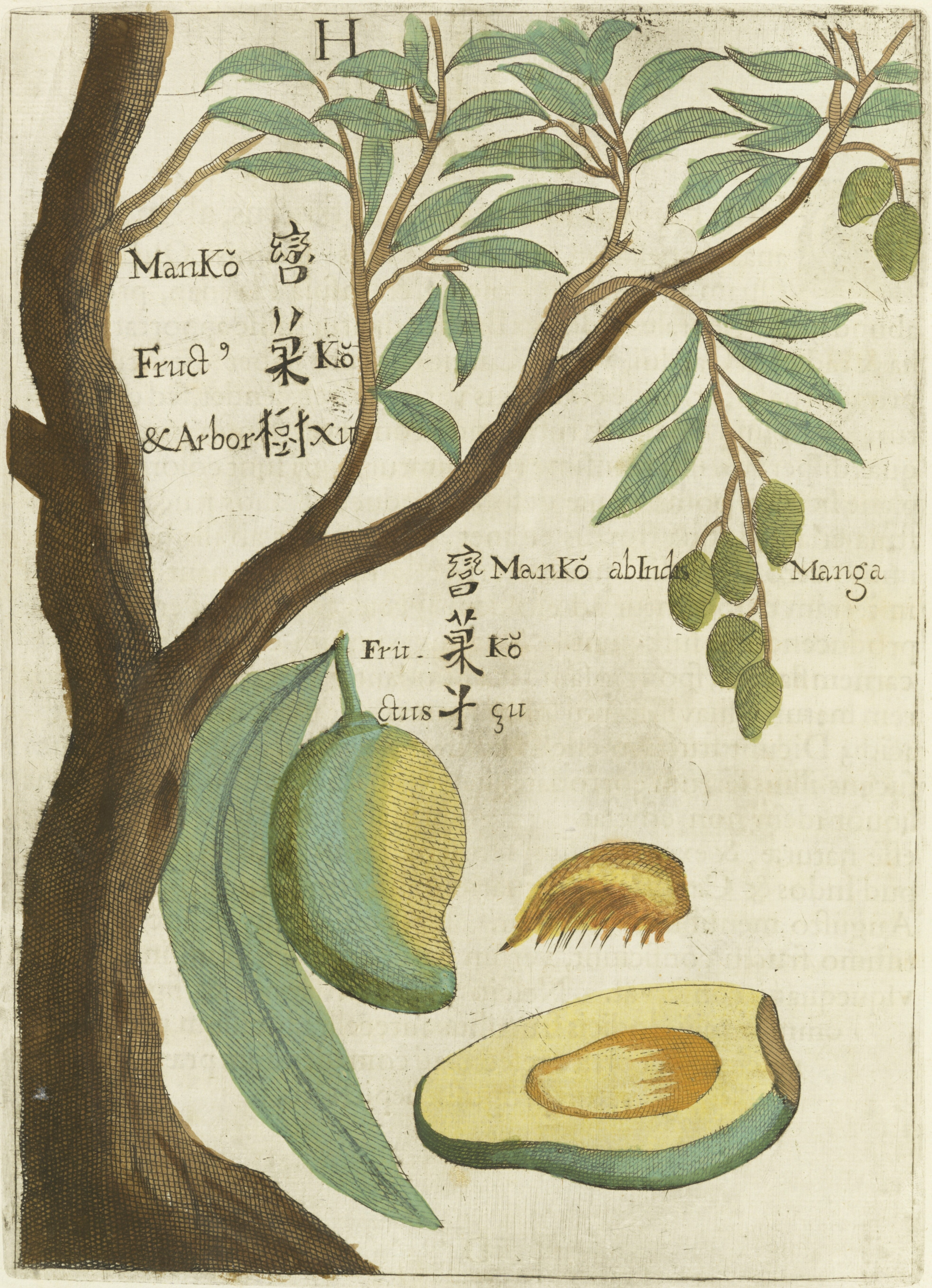
A plate from Michał Boym's Flora Sinensis (1656), the first description of an ecosystem of the Far East published in Europe

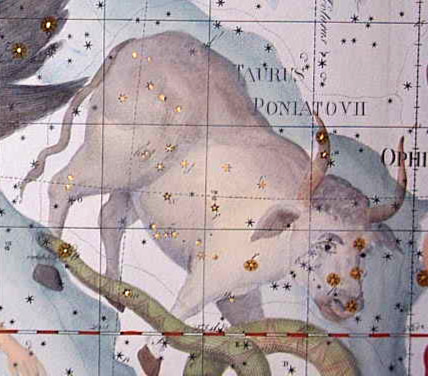
Taurus Poniatovii, constellation originated by Marcin Poczobutt in 1777 to honor the king Stanisław II Augustus

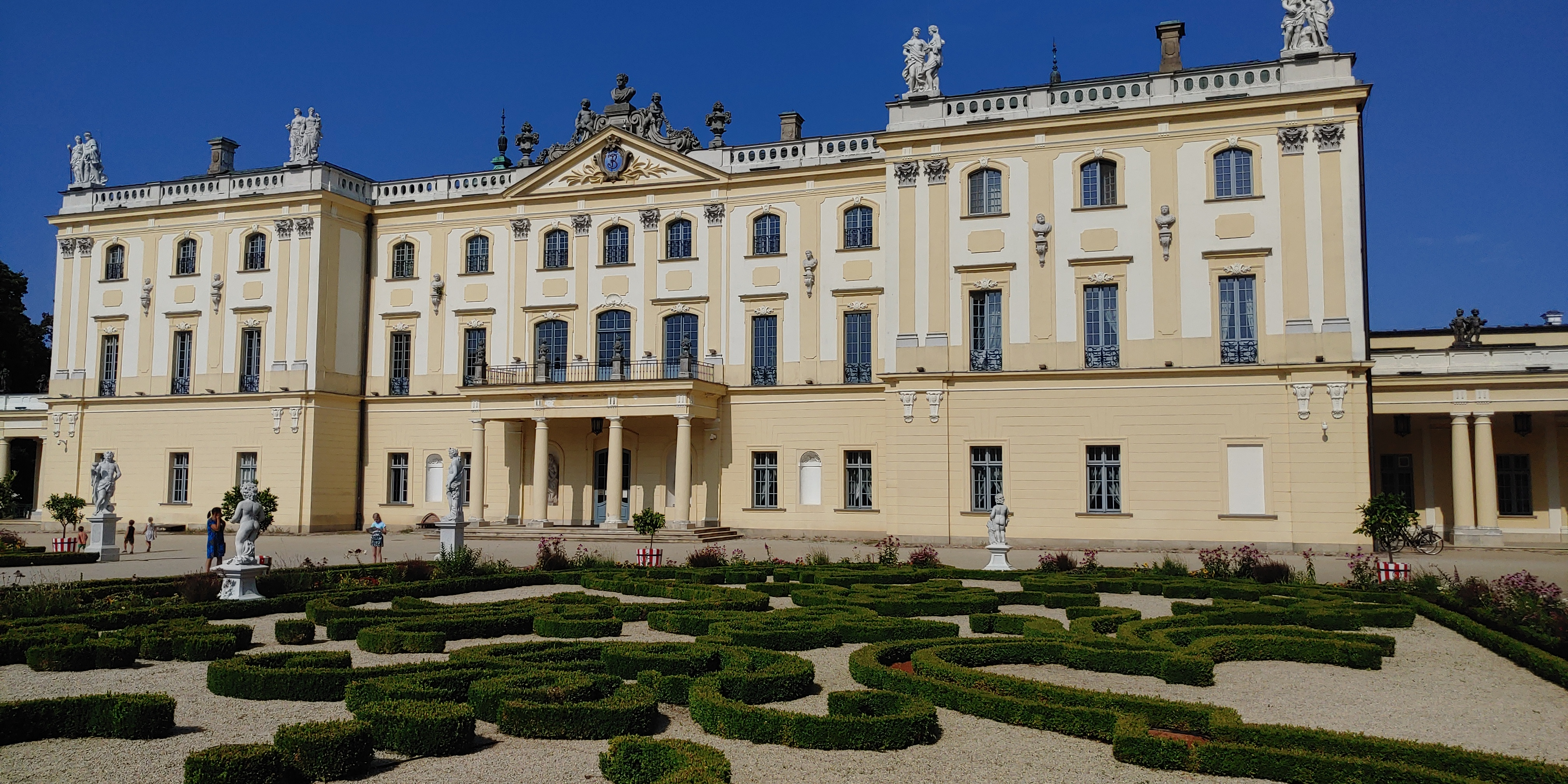
Branicki Palace in Białystok, designed by Tylman van Gameren, is sometimes referred to as the "Polish Versailles".

Pažaislis Monastery in Kaunas, Pietro Puttini, built 1674–1712

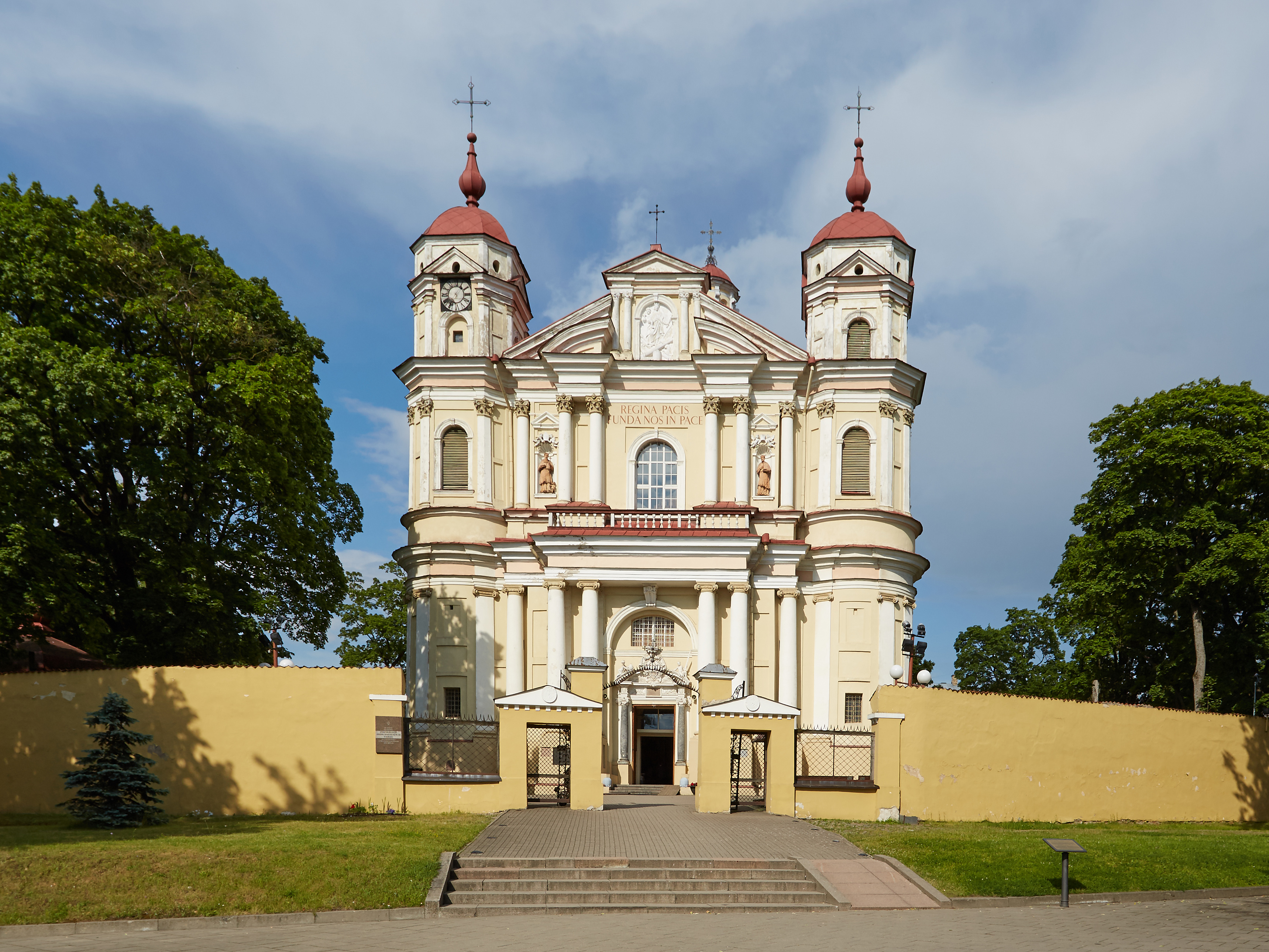
Church of St. Peter and St. Paul in Vilnius, Pietro Puttini, built 1675–1704

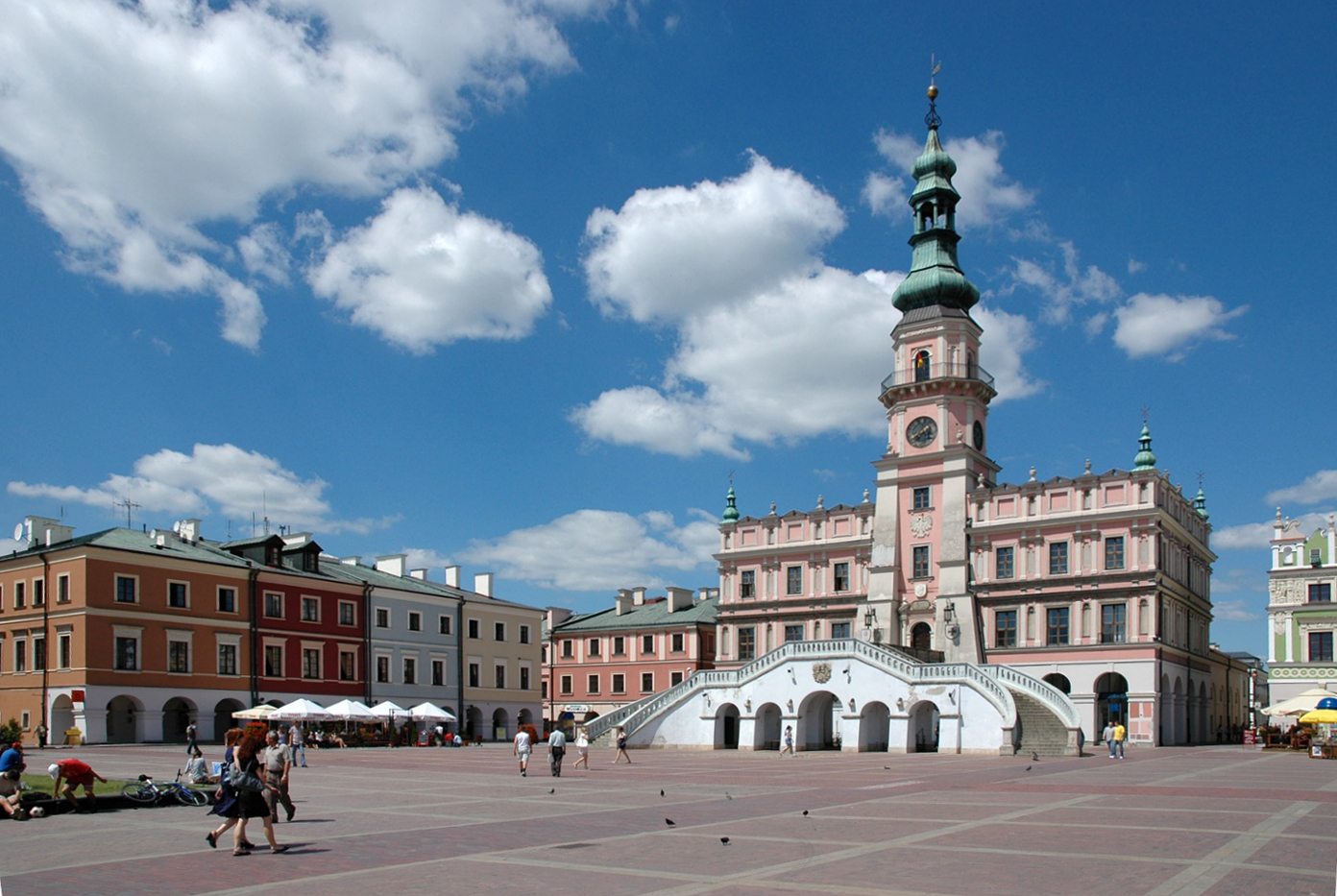
Zamość City Hall, designed by Bernardo Morando, is a unique example of Renaissance architecture in Europe, consistently built in accordance with the Italian theories of an "ideal town".

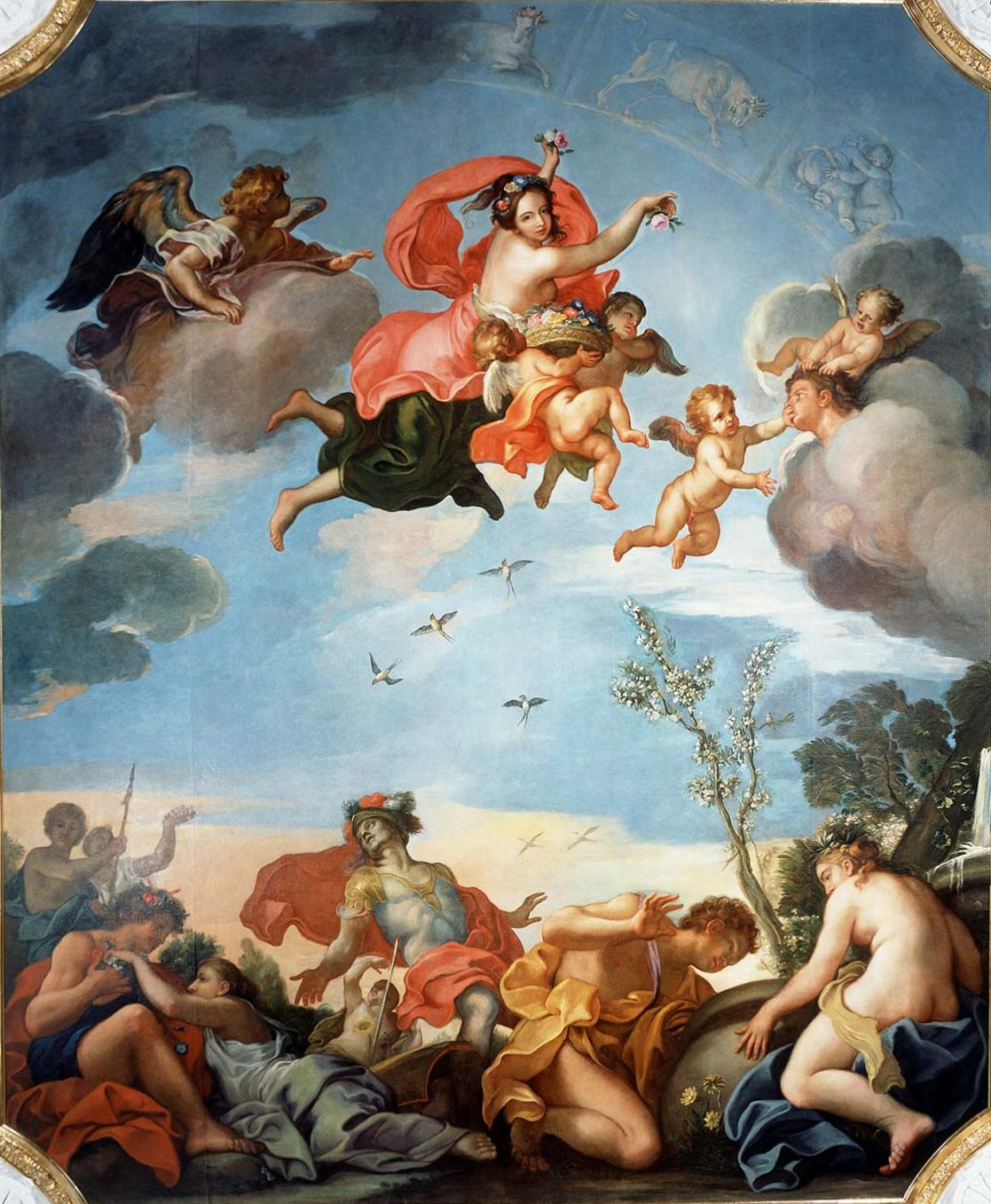
Plafond Allegory of Spring, Jerzy Siemiginowski, 1680s, Wilanów Palace

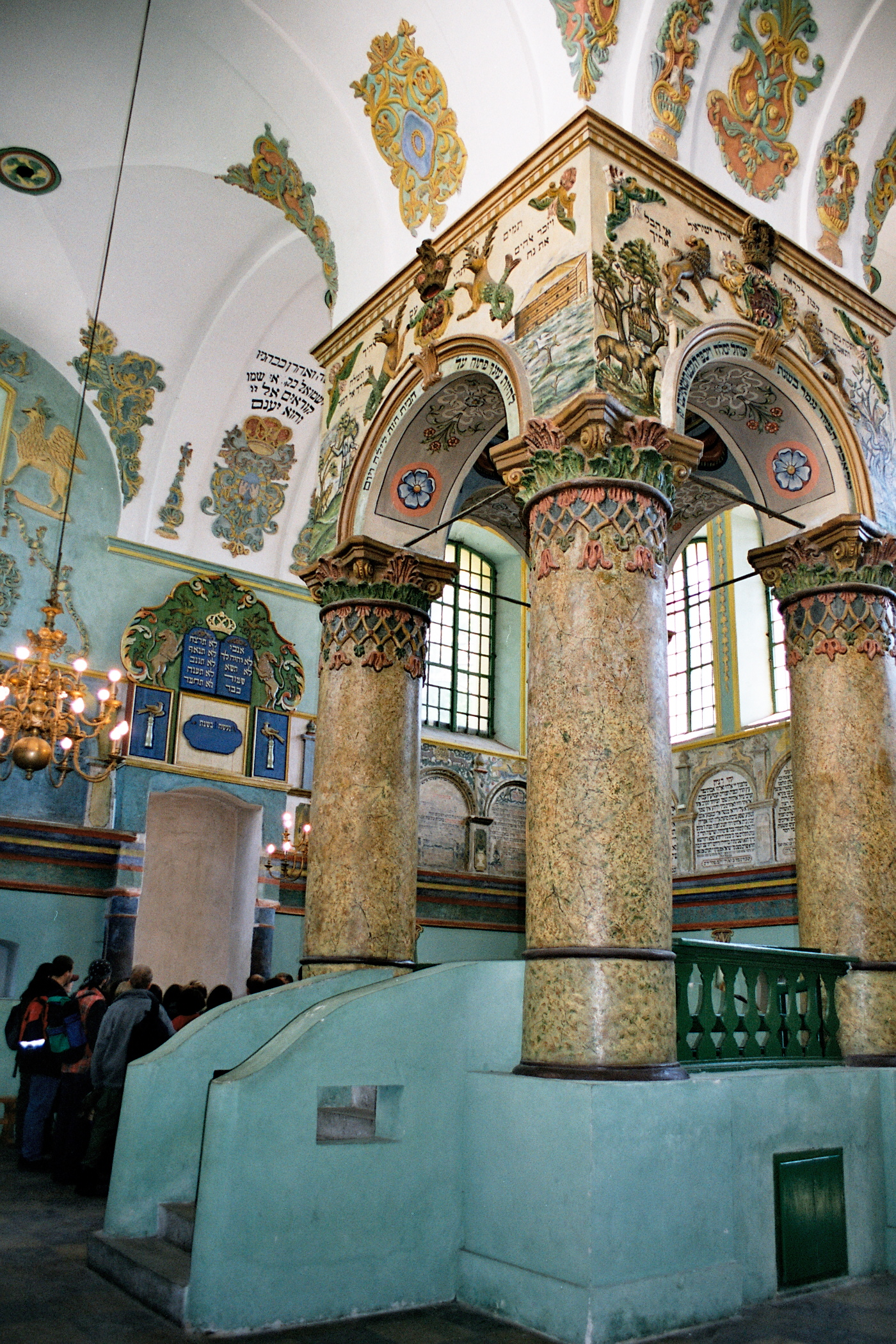
Łańcut Synagogue was established by Stanisław Lubomirski, 1733.

== See also ==
- History of the Polish–Lithuanian Commonwealth (1569–1648)
- History of the Polish–Lithuanian Commonwealth (1648–1764)
- History of the Polish–Lithuanian Commonwealth (1764–1795)
- List of medieval great powers
- Armorial of Polish nobility
- List of szlachta
- Polish heraldry
- Lithuanian nobility
- Armenians in Poland
- History of the Germans in Poland
- History of the Jews in Poland
- History of Poland
- History of Lithuania
- Polish–Lithuanian–Ruthenian Commonwealth
- Polish–Lithuanian–Muscovite Commonwealth

== Bibliography ==
- Bardach, Juliusz; Lesnodorski, Boguslaw; Pietrzak, Michal (1987). Historia panstwa i prawa polskiego. Warsaw: Paristwowe Wydawnictwo Naukowe. ISBN 978-83-01-07919-2.
- Brzezinski, Richard (1987). Polish Armies (1): 1569–1696. Men-At-Arms Series. Vol. 184. Osprey Publishing. ISBN 0-85045-736-X.
- Brzezinski, Richard (1988). Polish Armies (2): 1569–1696. Men-At-Arms Series. Vol. 188. Osprey Publishing. ISBN 0-85045-744-0.
- Frost, Robert (2015). The Oxford History of Poland–Lithuania. Vol. I: The Making of the Polish–Lithuanian Union, 1385–1569. Oxford University Press. ISBN 978-0-19-820869-3.
- Litwin, Henryk (October 2016). "Central European Superpower". BUM Magazine.
- Norkus, Zenonas (2017). An Unproclaimed Empire: The Grand Duchy of Lithuania: From the Viewpoint of Comparative Historical Sociology of Empires. Routledge. ISBN 978-1-138-28154-7.
- Rowell, S. C. (2014). Lithuania Ascending: A Pagan Empire within East-Central Europe, 1295–1345. Cambridge Studies in Medieval Life and Thought: Fourth Series. Cambridge University Press. ISBN 978-1-107-65876-9.
- Rowell, S. C.; Baronas, Darius (2015). The Conversion of Lithuania. From Pagan Barbarians to Late Medieval Christians. Vilnius: Institute of Lithuanian Literature and Folklore. ISBN 978-609-425-152-8.
- Stone, Daniel Z. (2014). The Polish–Lithuanian State, 1386–1795. University of Washington Press. ISBN 978-0-295-80362-3.
- Sužiedėlis, Saulius A. (2011). Historical Dictionary of Lithuania (2 ed.). Scarecrow Press. ISBN 978-0-8108-7536-4.
