= List of armed conflicts between Poland and Russia =

This is a list of armed conflicts between Poland and Russia.

This list includes their predecessor states: Piast Poland, the Crown of the Kingdom of Poland, the Polish–Lithuanian Commonwealth, the Kievan Rus', the Principality of Moscow, the Tsardom of Russia, the Russian Empire, and the Soviet Union:

Polish or Polish–Lithuanian victory
Russian, Soviet, or Muscovite victory
Another result*

*e.g. result unknown or indecisive/inconclusive, result of internal conflict inside Poland or Russia in which the other intervened, status quo ante bellum, or a treaty or peace without a clear result.

== Piast Poland versus Kievan Rus' ==
This is a list of wars between Piast Poland and Kievan Rus', from the 10th to the 13th century.

Polish victory
Kievan Rus' victory
Another result*

*e.g. result unknown or indecisive/inconclusive, result of internal conflict inside Piast Poland or Kievan Rus' in which the other intervened, status quo ante bellum, or a treaty or peace without a clear result.

Date	Conflict	Piast Poland and allies	Kievan Rus' and allies	Result
981	Vladimir the Great's Polish Campaign	Civitas Schinesghe	Kievan Rus'	Kievan Rus' victory
1013	Bolesław the Brave's expedition to Kievan Rus	Civitas Schinesghe	Kievan Rus'	Polish victory
1017	Yaroslav the Wise's raid of gord	Civitas Schinesghe	Kievan Rus'	Polish victory
1018	Bolesław I's intervention in the Kievan succession crisis	Civitas Schinesghe; Pro-Sviatopolk Kievan Rus'	Pro-Yaroslav Kievan Rus'	Temporary joint victory for Poland and Sviatopolk: Poles left Kiev; acquired Cherven Cities; Yaroslav ousted Sviatopolk from Kiev
1022	Yaroslav the Wise's attack on Brest	Civitas Schinesghe	Kievan Rus'	Polish victory
1030–1031	Yaroslav the Wise invasion in Poland(German-Polish War)	Kingdom of Poland	Kievan Rus'	Kievan Rus' victory: Kievan Rus' recovered the Cherven Cities
1065–1069	Rebellion of Vseslav of Polotsk: Sieges of Pskov and Novgorod (1065–1067); Battle on the Nemiga River (1067); Kiev uprising of 1068; Intervention by Bolesław II the Bold (1069)	Principality of Kiev; Principality of Chernigov; Principality of Pereyaslavl; Kingdom of Poland (1069)	Principality of Polotsk	Allied victory: Principality of Polotsk defeated (1067); Brief Vseslav reign in Kiev (1068–May 1069); Polish intervention (May 1069); Restoration of Iziaslav I of Kiev (May 1069)
1076–1077	Kievan succession crisis: Casus belli: death of Sviatoslav Yaroslavich (26 December 1076); Vsevolod besieged Iziaslav in Volyn (1077); Boris Sviatoslavich captured Chernigov, but Vsevolod ousted him (May 1077); Iziaslav recovered Kiev with Polish support (July 1077)	Iziaslav Yaroslavich; Bolesław II of Poland Boris Sviatoslavich	Vsevolod Yaroslavich	Compromise: Iziaslav and Vsevolod concluded peace; Iziaslav recovered Kiev with Polish help (July 1077); Vsevolod retained Chernigov; Sons of Sviatoslav exiled to Tmutorakan
1092	Vasilko Rostislavich's raid on Poland	Kingdom of Poland	Kievan Rus'	Kievan Rus' victory
1120—1125	Polish-Ruthenian war (1120—1125): Kievan-Cuman raid on Poland (1120); Battle of Wysokie (1122); Siege of Volodymyr (1123); Battle of Wilichów (1124)	Kingdom of Poland	Kievan Rus'	Polish victory (Note: In the end, after the Battle of Wilichów, Bolesław III Wrymouth defeated Vladimirko Volodarovich)
1142-1143	Vsevolod's raid on Poland	Kingdom of Poland	Kievan Rus'	Kievan Rus' victory
1163	Polish raid on Rus'	Kingdom of Poland	Kievan Rus'	Polish victory
1182–1183	War for Brest	Kingdom of Poland	Kievan Rus'	Polish victory
1192	Battle of Drohiczyn	Kingdom of Poland	Kievan Rus'	Polish victory

== Crown of the Kingdom of Poland versus Principality of Moscow ==
Date	Conflict	Poland and allies	Moscow and allies	Result
1507–1508	Lithuanian-Muscovite War	Grand Duchy of Lithuania; Kingdom of Poland	Principality of Moscow	Disputed: Principality of Moscow gives Liubech and six border counties to the Grand Duchy of Lithuania; Lithuania renounces claims to lost territories as a result Lithuanian-Muscovite War (1500-1503)
1512–1522	Lithuanian–Muscovite War	Grand Duchy of Lithuania; Crown of the Kingdom of Poland	Grand Principality of Moscow	Muscovite victory: Muscovy Captures Smolensk
1534–1537	Lithuanian-Muscovite War	Grand Duchy of Lithuania; Crown of the Kingdom of Poland	Principality of Moscow	Inconclusive: Grand Duchy of Lithuania gains Gomel; Principality of Moscow gains Sebezh and Zawołocze

== Polish–Lithuanian Commonwealth versus Tsarist Russia ==
Date	Conflict	Poland–Lithuania and allies	Russia and allies	Result
1562–1570	Russian-Lithuanian War of 1562-1570	Grand Duchy of Lithuania; Crown of the Kingdom of Poland; From 1569: Polish–Lithuanian Commonwealth	Tsardom of Russia (or Muscovy)	Russian (Muscovite) victory
1577–1582	Livonian campaign of Stephen Báthory	Polish–Lithuanian Commonwealth; Principality of Transylvania	Russia	Polish–Lithuanian victory: Livonia, Courland and Semigallia to Poland–Lithuania.
1605	1st Dimitriad	False Dmitry 1 Polish–Lithuanian Commonwealth	Tsardom of Russia Russian supporters	Victory of False Dmitry 1
1606	Moscow Uprising	False Dmitry 1 Polish–Lithuanian Commonwealth	Tsardom of Russia Russian supporters	Victory of Shuisky's coalition
1607–1609	2nd Dimitriad	False Dmitry 2 Polish–Lithuanian Commonwealth	Tsardom of Russia Russian supporters	Government victory
1609–1618	Polish–Muscovite War	Polish–Lithuanian Commonwealth; Zaporozhian Cossacks	Tsardom of Russia; Kingdom of Sweden (Note: 1609–1610)	Polish–Lithuanian victory: Truce of Deulino; Poland–Lithuania gains Severia, Chernihiv and Smolensk
Autumn 1632 – Spring 1634	Smolensk War	Polish–Lithuanian Commonwealth; Zaporozhian Cossacks	Tsardom of Russia	Polish–Lithuanian victory: Treaty of Polyanovka; Russian failure to retake Smolensk.; Russia receives Serpeysk (Note: To encourage Russia to join the anti-Swedish alliance)
1654–1667	Russo-Polish War	Polish-Lithuanian Commonwealth; Crimean Khanate; Cossack Hetmanate (1658–1659, 1660–1667 in Right-bank Ukraine); Duchy of Prussia (1654–1656)	Tsardom of Russia; Cossack Hetmanate	Russian victory: Truce of Andrusovo; Russia gains control of left-bank Ukraine, Kiev and Smolensk.
18 May – 27 July 1792	Polish–Russian War of 1792	Poland–Lithuania	Russian Empire (Polish–Lithuanian Commonwealth) Targowica Confederates	Russian victory: Second Partition of Poland
24 March – 16 November 1794	Kościuszko Uprising	Poland–Lithuania	Russian Empire; Kingdom of Prussia; Holy Roman Empire (Habsburg Monarchy) (Note: They did not participate in active hostilities.); Duchy of Courland	Russo-Prussian victory: Dissolution of the Polish-Lithuanian Commonwealth; Third Partition of Poland

== Polish states and rebels versus Russian Empire ==
Date	Conflict	Polish states and allies	Russia and allies	Result
9 October 1806 – 9 July 1807	War of the Fourth Coalition: Siege of Danzig (1807)	(First French Empire) France: Confederation of the Rhine; (Kingdom of Etruria) Etruria; Holland; (Kingdom of Italy (Napoleonic)) Italy; (Kingdom of Naples) Naples; (Kingdom of Saxony) Saxony (from 11 Dec 1806); Polish Legions; (Old Swiss Confederacy) Swiss Confederation; Spain Polish rebels	Fourth Coalition: (Kingdom of Prussia) Prussia; Russia; United Kingdom; Saxony (until 11 Dec 1806); Sweden; Sicily; Septinsular Republic (from 17th June 1807)	French victory: Treaties of Tilsit; Treaty of Posen; Prussia loses over half of its territory; Creation of the Duchy of Warsaw and the Kingdom of Westphalia
24 June – 24 December 1812	French invasion of Russia, pitched by Napoleon as the "Second Polish War"	(First French Empire) French Empire Duchy of Warsaw; Italy; Naples Rhine Confederation: (Kingdom of Saxony) Saxony; (Kingdom of Bavaria) Bavaria; (Kingdom of Westphalia) Westphalia; (Kingdom of Württemberg) Württemberg; (Grand Duchy of Hesse) Hesse; Berg; (Grand Duchy of Baden) Baden; Switzerland; Spain; French allies: Austria; Prussia	Russia; United Kingdom	Russian victory; Escalation of the conflict into the Sixth Coalition
24 December 1812 – 30 May 1814	War of the Sixth Coalition	France: Duchy of Warsaw (Note: The Duchy of Warsaw as a state was in effect fully occupied by Russian and Prussian forces by May 1813, although most Poles remained loyal to Napoleon.); Italy; Naples; Napoleonic Spain (Note: Dissolved after the Battle of Vitoria in June 1813); Confederation of the Rhine (Note: Many member states defected after the Battle of Leipzig); Denmark–Norway (1813–1814)	Original coalition: Russia; Prussia; Spain; United Kingdom; Hanover; (Grand Duchy of Mecklenburg-Schwerin) Mecklenburg-Schwerin; Portugal; Sardinia; Sicily; Sweden; After the Armistice of Pläswitz: Austria; Bavaria; After the Battle of Leipzig: (Grand Duchy of Baden) Baden; Saxony; After 20 November 1813 (Sovereign Principality of the United Netherlands) Netherlands After January 1814 Denmark	Coalition victory: Creation of Congress Poland
29 November 1830 – 21 October 1831	November Uprising	National Government	(Russia) Russian Empire: Congress Poland; Polish Loyalists	Russian victory
22 January 1863 – 18 June 1864/1865	January Uprising	Polish National Government: Rebels from the pre-partition lands of the Polish-Lithuanian Commonwealth; Garibaldi Legion; Foreign volunteers: (France) French volunteers; (United Kingdom) British volunteers; Hungarian volunteers; Supported by: Land and Liberty; Dzyalynsky Committee	Russian Empire: Warsaw; Vilna; Kiev; Supported by: Kingdom of Prussia	Russian victory
1905–1907	Revolution in the Kingdom of Poland	Polish revolutionaries: Worker militias; Polish Socialist Party; Combat Organization; SDKPiL; Bund; Anarchists	(Russia) Imperial Government: Russian Army; Okhrana; Polish reactionaries: National-Democratic Party; Stronnictwo Polityki Realnej (Real Politics Party)	Imperial Government victory

== Second Polish Republic versus Soviet Union ==
Date	Conflict	Poland and allies	Soviet Union and allies	Result
1918/1919 (Note: There is disagreement over the dates of the war. The Encyclopædia Britannica begins its "Russo-Polish War" article with the date range 1919–1920 but then states, "Although there had been hostilities between the two countries during 1919, the conflict began when the Polish head of state Józef Piłsudski formed an alliance with the Ukrainian nationalist leader Symon Petlyura (21 April 1920) and their combined forces began to overrun Ukraine, occupying Kiev on 7 May." Some Western historians, including Norman Davies, consider mid-February 1919 the beginning of the war. However, military confrontations between forces that can be considered officially Polish and the Red Army were already happening by late autumn 1918 and in January 1919. The city of Vilnius, for example, was taken by the Soviets on 5 January 1919.) – 18 March 1921	Polish–Soviet War	Poland; Ukraine (1920); Belarus (1920); Latvia (1920) (Note: Battle of Daugavpils); Support: France; Hungary; Romania; United Kingdom (Note: Volunteers); United States	Russian SFSR; Ukrainian SSR; Byelorussian SSR; Polrewkom	Polish victory; Poland retained control of modern-day Western Ukraine and Western Belarus (Kresy in interwar Poland); Soviet forces retained control of modern-day Eastern Ukraine and Eastern Belarus
17 September – 6 October 1939	Soviet invasion of Poland	Poland	Soviet Union; Co-belligerent: (Nazi Germany) Germany	Soviet victory: Territory of Eastern Poland (Kresy) annexed by the Soviet Union

== See also ==
- Hungarian Revolution of 1848
- Baikal Insurrection
- War of the Fourth Coalition
- Civil war in Poland (1704–1706)
- War of the Polish Succession
- Anti-communist resistance in Poland (1944–1953)
- Polish October
- Martial law in Poland
- History of the Russo-Turkish wars – Series of conflicts between 1568 and 1918
- List of wars and battles involving Galicia–Volhynia
- List of wars involving Kievan Rus'
- List of wars involving the Principality of Moscow
- List of wars involving Poland
- List of wars involving Russia
- List of wars involving Sweden
- List of wars involving Ukraine
- Muscovite–Lithuanian Wars – Series of wars between the Grand Duchy of Lithuania and the Grand Duchy of Moscow – in most of which Kingdom of Poland was allied with the Grand Duchy of Lithuania
- Poland–Russia relations
- Polish–Ottoman Wars
- Polish–Swedish wars
- Polish–Teutonic War – Military conflicts
- Russo-Swedish Wars
- Russo-Finnish wars
- Russo-Persian Wars – Series of conflicts between 1651 and 1828

== Sources ==
- Włodarski, Bronisław (1927), Polityka ruska Leszka białego, vol. III, Lviv: Biblioteka Uniwersytecka w Poznaniu
- Kotlar, Nikolai (2003). Политика южной Руси [The politics of Southern Russia] (in Russian). Алетейя. ISBN 5-89329-593-5.
- Gumilev, Lev (2023) [1992]. От Руси к России [For Rus' to Russia]. Эксклюзивная классика (revised ed.). Moscow: AST. ISBN 978-5-17-153845-3.
- Karamzin, Nikolay (1824). История Государства Российского [History of the Russian state]. Volume II, Chapter IX.
- Martin, Janet (2007). Medieval Russia: 980–1584. Second Edition. E-book. Cambridge: Cambridge University Press. ISBN 978-0-511-36800-4.
- Solovyov, Sergey (1879). История России с древнейших времён [The history of Russia since ancient times] (in Russian). Chapter VII.
- Pashuto, Vladimir (1968). Внешняя политика Руси [The foreign policy of Russia] (in Russian). Moscow: Наука.
