= Siege of Smolensk (1632–1633) =

Part of Smolensk War

Coordinates: 54°47′N 32°03′E

- Part of Smolensk War
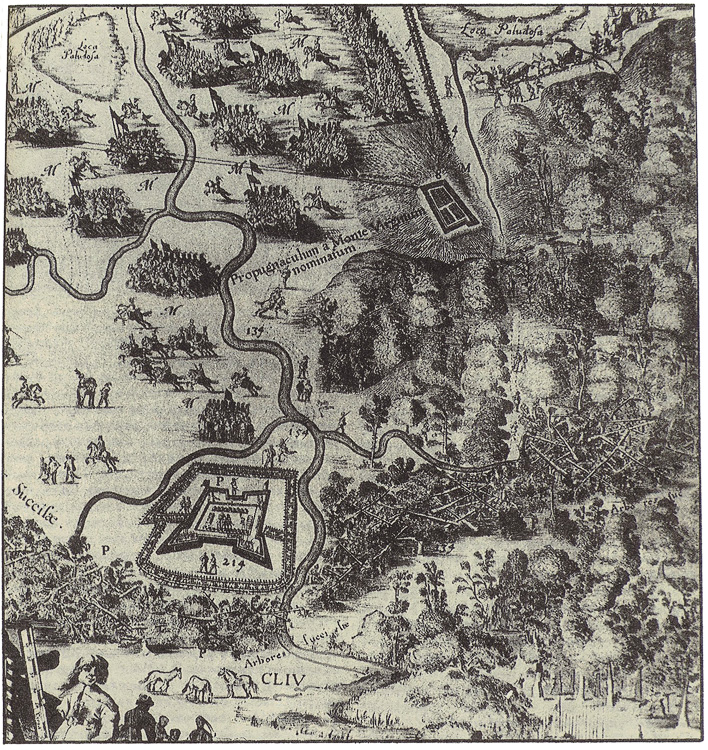
- Siege of Smolensk, engraving from 1636
Date	28 October 1632 – 4 October 1633
Location	Smolensk, Polish–Lithuanian Commonwealth
Result	Polish–Lithuanian victory

Belligerents
Polish–Lithuanian Commonwealth	Tsardom of Russia

Commanders and leaders
King Władysław IV; Samuel Drucki-Sokoliński; Krzysztof Radziwiłł; Aleksander Korwin Gosiewski	Mikhail Shein; Artemy Izmaylov; Semyon Prozorovsky; Bogdan Nagoy

Strength
Garrison of Smolensk: 2,212 soldiers less than 170 artillery pieces Relief force: 13,200 infantry and dragoons 8,300 cavalry 12,000 Zaporozhians	20,000–24,000 soldiers 160 artillery pieces

Casualties and losses
Unknown	Unknown

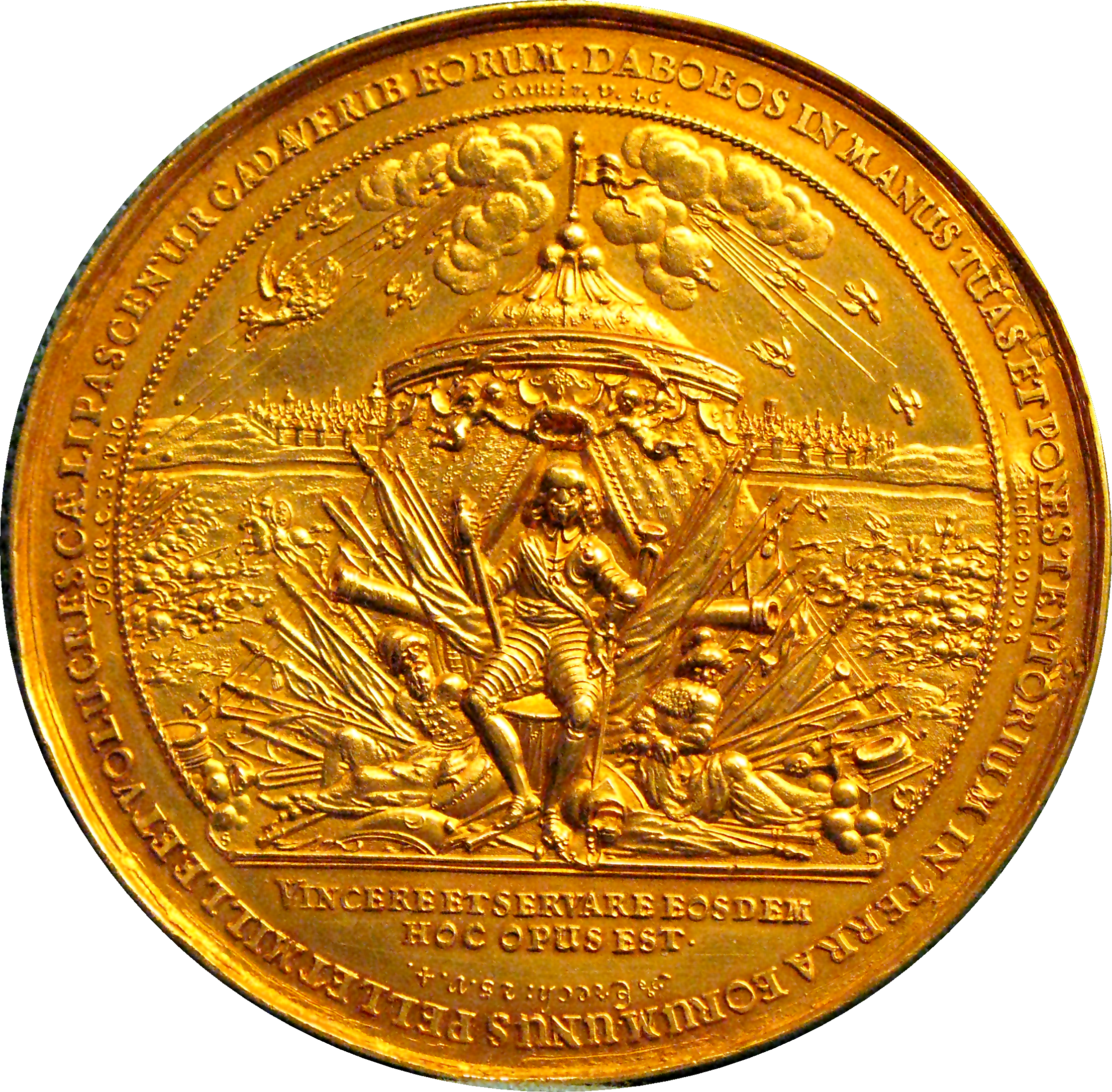
Medal commemorating Polish victory over Russia in Smolensk 1634

The siege of Smolensk lasted almost a year between 1632 and 1633, when the Muscovite army besieged the Polish–Lithuanian city of Smolensk during the war named after that siege. Russian forces of over 25,000 under Mikhail Borisovich Shein began the siege of Smolensk on 28 October. The Polish garrison under Samuel Drucki-Sokoliński numbered about 3,000. The fortress held out for nearly a year, and in 1633 the newly elected Polish king Władysław IV organised a relief force. In a series of fierce engagements, Commonwealth forces gradually overran the Russian field fortifications, and by 4 October the siege had broken. Shein had become besieged in his camp, and began surrender negotiations in January 1634, capitulating around 1 March.

== Background ==
In 1632, Sigismund III Vasa, the King of Poland and Grand Duke of Lithuania, died. Russia, having recovered to a certain extent from the Time of Troubles, decided to capitalize on the temporary confusion of its western neighbor. Russia's aim was to gain control of Smolensk, which it had ceded to the Commonwealth in 1618 at the Truce of Deulino, ending the last Russo-Polish War. Smolensk was the capital of the Commonwealth's Smoleńsk Voivodeship, but it had often been contested, and it changed hands many times during the 15th, 16th, and 17th centuries (from the days of the Muscovite–Lithuanian Wars).

== Opposing forces ==
The Russian army that crossed the Lithuanian border in early October 1632 had been carefully prepared and was under the experienced command of Mikhail Shein, who had previously defended Smolensk against the Poles during the 1609–1611 siege. Estimates of the size of the Russian forces vary, from 20,000 through 25,000 and 30,000 to 34,500, with 160 artillery pieces. However, the numbers over 25,000 give the overall number of Shein's army when leaving Moscow. A part of this army was left behind as garrisons in newly conquered cities such as Dorogobuzh, Belaya, and others. Based on archival documents, the Russian historian Menshikov gives the initial number of Shein's army at Smolensk as 24,000 men but indicates that the number reduced to 20,000 by August when many Russian soldiers left the army to protect their estates endangered by the Crimean khan's summer raid on South Russia.

Compared to former Russian armies, Shein's army was significantly modernised. Dissatisfied with their traditional formations of musket-equipped infantry (the streltsy), the Russians looked to foreign officers to update the equipment and training of their troops based on the Western European model of regulars, dragoons, and reiters. Eight such regiments, totaling 14,000 to 17,000 men, comprised a part of Shein's army.

Commonwealth forces in Smolensk were composed of the Smolensk garrison (about 1,600 men with 170 artillery pieces under the command of the Voivode of Smolensk, Aleksander Korwin Gosiewski), strengthened by the local nobility, which formed a pospolite ruszenie force of about 1,500 strong. The city's fortifications had also recently been improved with Italian-style bastions. By mid-1632 the deputy voivode (podwojewoda) of Smoleńsk, Samuel Drucki-Sokoliński, had about 500 volunteers from pospolite ruszenie and 2,500 regular army soldiers and Cossacks.

== Siege ==
Shein began the siege of Smolensk on 28 October. The Muscovite forces constructed lines of circumvallation around the fortress. Using tunnels and mines, his forces damaged a long section of the city wall and one of its towers. Russian heavy artillery, mostly of Western manufacture, reached Smolensk in December 1632 with even heavier guns arriving the following March. After a preliminary artillery bombardment, Shein ordered an assault, which was repulsed by the Polish defenders. Nonetheless, the siege was progressing; Smolensk's fortifications were being eroded, and the defenders were suffering heavy casualties and running out of supplies. By June 1633, some soldiers started to desert, and others talked of surrender.

Despite these difficulties, the city, commanded by Deputy Voivode Samuel Drucki-Sokoliński, held out throughout 1633 while the Commonwealth, under its newly elected King Władysław IV, organised a relief force. The Sejm officially sanctioned a declaration of war and authorised a large payment (6.5 million zlotys, the highest tax contribution during Władysław's entire reign) for the raising of a suitable force in Spring 1633. The intended relief force would have an effective strength of about 21,500 men and would include: 24 chorągiews of Winged Hussars (~3,200 horses), 27 chorągiews of light cavalry—also known as Cossack cavalry but not composed of Cossacks—(3,600 horses), 10 squadrons of raitars (~1,700 horses), 7 Lithuanian petyhor regiments (~780 horses), 7 large regiments of dragoons (~2,250 horses), and ~20 regiments of infantry (~12,000 men). Over 10,000 of the infantry would be organized based on the Western model, previously not common in Commonwealth armies.

Meanwhile, Field Hetman of Lithuania and Voivode of Vilnius, Krzysztof Radziwiłł, and Voivode Gosiewski established a camp about 30 kilometres (18.6 mi) from Smolensk, moving from Orsha to Bajów and later, Krasne. By February 1633, they had amassed around 4,500 soldiers, including over 2,000 infantry, and were engaged in raiding the rear areas of the Russian besiegers to disrupt their logistics. Hetman Radziwiłł also managed to break through the Russian lines on several occasions, bringing about 1,000 soldiers and supplies into Smolensk to reinforce the fortress and raising the defenders' morale.

By the summer of 1633, the relief force, led personally by the king and numbering about 25,000 (20,000 in the Polish-Lithuanian army, according to Jasienica), arrived near Smolensk; they reached Orsha on 17 August 1633. By the first days of September, the main body of the relief forces approaching Smolensk numbered around 14,000. The Russian army, recently reinforced, numbered 25,000. Only when Cossack reinforcements, led by Timofiy Orendarenko and numbering between 10,000 and 20,000, arrived on 17 September would the Commonwealth army gain numerical superiority. The Cossacks under Orendarenko and Marcin Kazanowski would raid the Russian rear lines, freeing the Polish-Lithuanian units under Radziwiłł and Gosiewski to join the effort to break the siege.

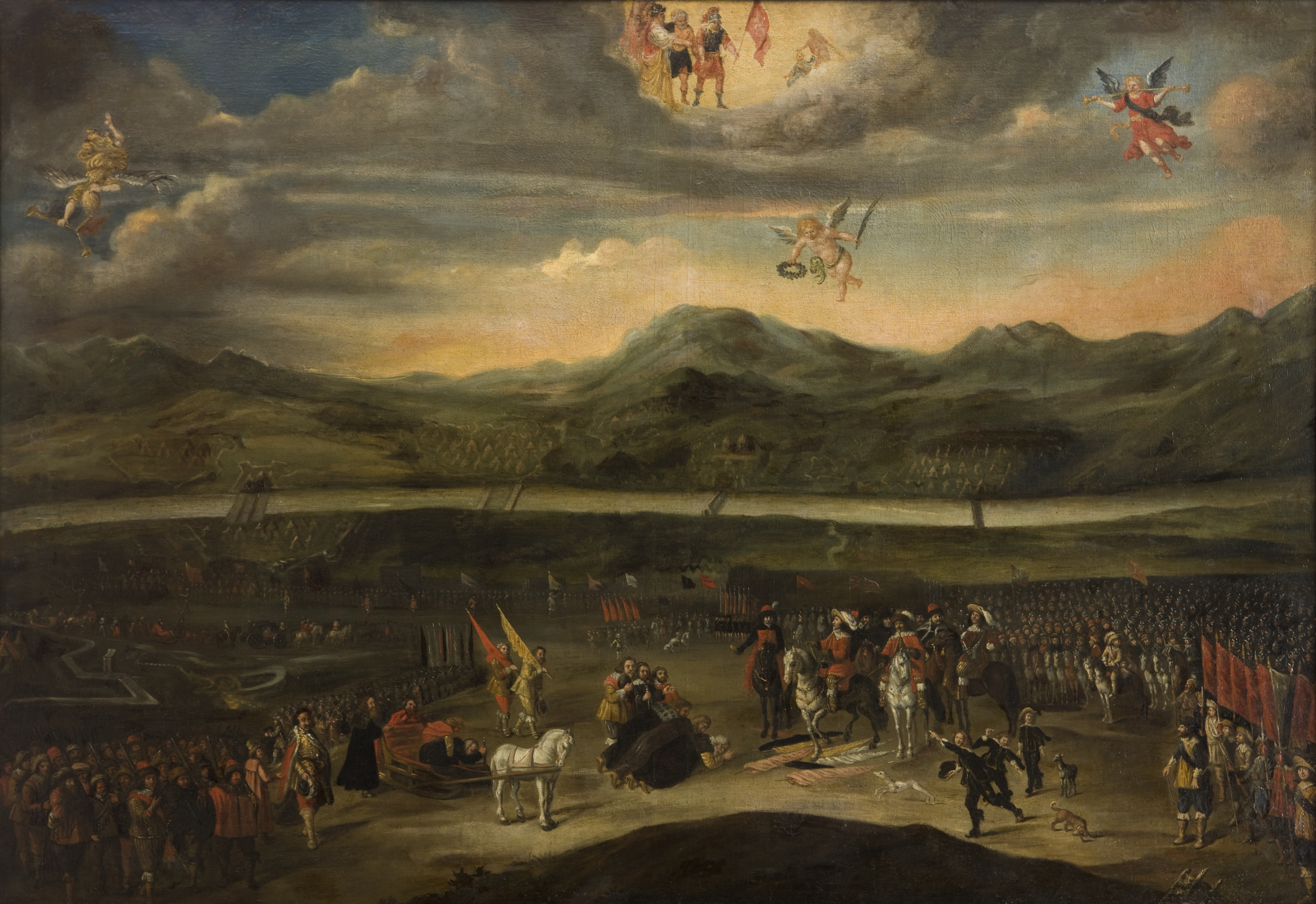
Surrender of Mikhail Shein to Władysław IV Vasa at Smolensk. Artist unknown.

Władysław's brother, John II Casimir, commanded one of the regiments in the relief army. Another notable commander was the Field Crown Hetman, Marcin Kazanowski. King Władysław IV, a great supporter of the modernization of the Commonwealth army, proved to be a good tactician, and his innovations in the use of artillery and fortifications based on Western ideas greatly contributed to the eventual Polish-Lithuanian success. He had replaced the old arquebusiers with musketeers, and standardized the Commonwealth artillery (introducing 3- to 6-pounder regimental guns), both to great effect.

Commonwealth's cavalry, including the Winged Hussars, significantly restricted Russian mobility, forcing them to stay in their trenches. In a series of fierce engagements, Commonwealth forces gradually overran the Russian field fortifications, and the siege reached its final stages by late September. On 28 September 1633, Commonwealth forces took the main Russian supply points, and by 4 October the siege had been broken.

Shein's army retreated to its main camp, which was in turn surrounded by Commonwealth forces in mid-October. The besieged Russians waited for relief, but none arrived, as Commonwealth and Cossack cavalry had been sent to disrupt the Russian rear. Some historians also cite dissent and internal divisions in the Russian camp as responsible for their inaction and ineffectiveness (Jasienica blames the Russian warlords, and Parker the foreign mercenaries). The Tatar invasion threatening the south Russian borderlands was a contributory factor, with many soldiers and boyars from those regions deserting the Russian camp to return to protect their homes. Some foreign mercenaries also deserted to the Commonwealth side.

Shein began surrender negotiations in January 1634, and by February they were in full swing. The Russians finally signed a surrender treaty on 25 February 1634, and on 1 March they vacated their camp. (Some scholars, such as Rickard and Black, give the date of 1 March for Shein's capitulation.) Under the surrender terms, the Russians had to leave behind most of their artillery but were allowed to retain their banners after a ceremony in which they were laid before King Władysław. They also had to promise not to engage Commonwealth forces for the next three months. Shein's forces numbered around 12,000 at the time of their capitulation, but over 4,000, including most of the foreign contingent, immediately decided to defect to the Commonwealth.

== Aftermath ==
After the victory at Smolensk, the Commonwealth army moved towards the fortress Belaya but the siege became a fiasco. The negotiations began on 30 April, and would end with the Treaty of Polyanovka in May.

== Bibliography ==
- Mirosław Nagielski, Diariusz kampanii smoleńskiej Władysława IV 1633-1634, DiG, 2006, ISBN 83-7181-410-0
