= Siege of Belaya =

- Part of Smolensk War
Date	February and March 1634
Location	Belaya, today Tver Oblast
Result	Russian victory

Belligerents
Polish-Lithuanian Commonwealth	Tsardom of Russia

Commanders and leaders
(Polish–Lithuanian Commonwealth) Władysław IV Vasa	Fyodor Volkonsky

Strength
Unknown	1,000

Casualties and losses
4,000 casualties	Unknown

The siege of Belaya was the final military episode of the Smolensk War. The defense of the fortress by its small Russia garrison against a large Polish-Lithuanian army of King Władysław IV Vasa thwarted the king's plan to march against Moscow and made him sign the Treaty of Polyanovka in which he relinquished his claims to the Russian throne.

== Previous events ==
The small fortress of Belaya which had fallen into the hands of the Commonwealth during the Time of Troubles was recaptured by the Russian army during its offensive in 1632. After its recapture it was garrisoned by a force of 1,000 soldiers under the command of the Voivode Fyodor Volkonsky. He had distinguished himself in 1618, during the defence of Moscow against Władysław IV as well as during his successful operations against raids from the Crimean Khanate.

During the fortuneless siege of Smolensk for the Russians, Volkonsky tried to help the Voivode Mikhail Shein by attacking Polish detachments, capturing Polish baggage, attracting the enemy's forces and repelling their attacks. After Shein's situation worsened and he signed the capitulation treaty, King Władysław IV (who still claimed to be the legitimate Russian Tsar) intended to improve on his success and moved his army towards Moscow. On his way to the Russian capital he wanted to capture the small fortress Belaya.

== The course of the siege ==
The first detachments of the Polish–Lithuanian army appeared at the walls of Belaya on March 23. The king sent negotiators who demanded an immediate surrender to avoid the king's "wrath". Otherwise the garrison and the citizens were to be punished by death. The envoys reminded Volkonsky of the capitulation of Shein. However, Volkonsky decisively refused by saying that Shein was not an example to him. The defenders of Belaya decided to fight till the bitter end and filled up the fortress gate with earth.

On March 28, artillery began bombardment of the fortress. The first sally of the Russian garrison took place on April 3. Another attack of the Russian garrison took place on 6 April and it was also successful, the Russians managed to capture two colonels, two soldiers, and eight Polish standards which were left unattended on the rampart. After this events, 3 officers who were responsible for the lack of effective protection of the camp were sentenced to death, the punishment raised discipline in the army and the next four attacks of the Russian garrison on 8–12 April were successfully repulsed. On 20 April, Polish cavalry under command of Kleczkowski invaded and looted Toropets region, captured prisoners and supplies. The largest sally of the Russian garrison took place on 30 April, where 200 streltsy were forced to flee.

After several days of shelling, the Commonwealth soldiers tried to blow up the fortifications of Belaya with the help of a subsurface mine but the engineers' calculations weren't precise enough. On 9 May, the explosion inflicted no harm to the fortress but killed 100 Polish infantry, the explosion caused bigger casualties as in the previous struggles during the siege. For Władysław the siege of the small fortress became a matter of honour and he decided to continue the siege at any price. From the military point of view it was a mistake because the freezing temperatures and the lack of food killed more and more of his army.

The siege lasted eight weeks and three days. Meanwhile, a 10,000 men strong Russian army led by the princes Dmitry Cherkassky and Dmitry Pozharsky gathered at the neighbouring Mozhaysk. Władysław became more concerned as weeks passed because he had received reports from hetman Koniecpolski that the Turkish sultan was about to lead a large army against the Commonwealth and Władysław entered into negotiations with the Russians.

== Consequences of the siege ==
Due to the steadfastness of the Belaya defenders, in June 1634 the Treaty of Polyanovka was signed. It reinforced the borders which were defined by the truce of Deulino of 1618. The Russians handed over several towns which they had taken during the war back to the Commonwealth but were able to keep Serpeysk. The Polish-Lithuanian king officially gave up his claims to the Russian throne.

The garrison commander Fyodor Volkonsky was celebrated in Moscow as a hero. The eight captured Polish standards were exhibited in the Dormition Cathedral in the Moscow Kremlin. Volkonsky was granted the rank of okolnichy by Tsar Michael Romanov as well as large estates.

== Links ==
- The siege of the Russian fortress Belaya
- An article about the siege of Belaya
