= Dorogobuzhsky =

Dorogobuzhsky (masculine), Dorogobuzhskaya (feminine), or Dorogobuzhskoye (neuter) may refer to:

- Dorogobuzhsky District, a district of Smolensk Oblast, Russia
- Dorogobuzhskoye Urban Settlement, an administrative division and a municipal formation which the town of Dorogobuzh in Dorogobuzhsky District of Smolensk Oblast, Russia is incorporated as
- Dorogobuzhsky (cheese), a soft cheese from Western Russia
- Dorogobuzhsky (family), a princely family of Rurikid stock
