= Siege of Smolensk =

Siege of Smolensk can refer to several battles:

- Siege of Smolensk (1502) during Muscovite–Lithuanian War (1500–1503)
- Siege of Smolensk (1514) during the fourth Muscovite–Lithuanian War (1512–1522)
- Siege of Smolensk (1609–1611) during the Polish–Muscovite War (1605–1618)
- Siege of Smolensk (1613–1617) during the Polish–Muscovite War (1605–1618)
- Siege of Smolensk (1632–1633) during the Smolensk War (1632–1634)
- Siege of Smolensk (1654) during the Russo-Polish War (1654–1667)

== See also ==
- Battle of Smolensk (disambiguation)
