= Siege of Dorogobuzh =

Coordinates: 54.92°N 33.3077°E

- Part of Smolensk War
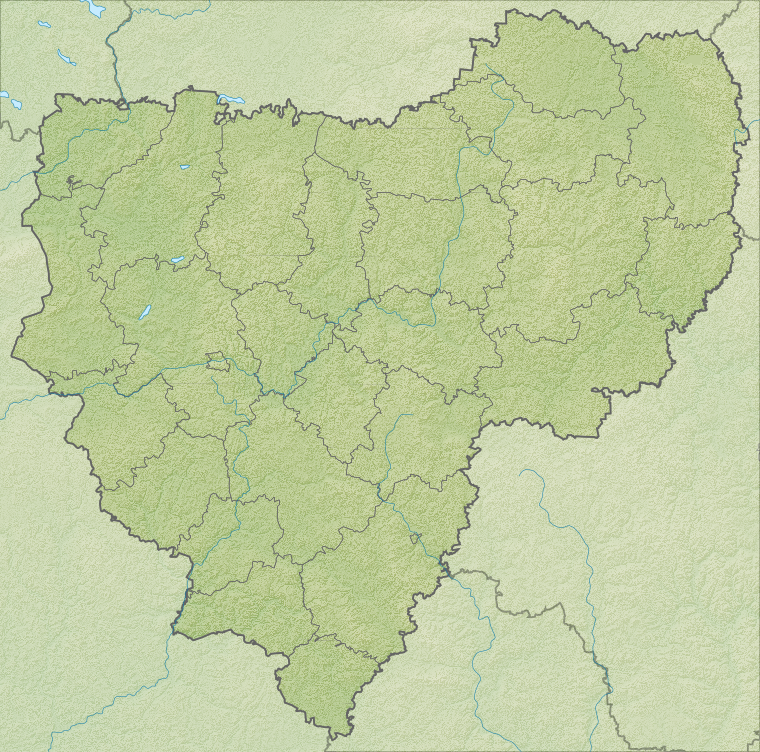
- Where the war happened.
Date	October 1632
Location	Dorogobuzh
Result	Russian victory

Belligerents
Tsardom of Russia	Polish–Lithuanian Commonwealth

Commanders and leaders
Fiodor Suchatin; Aleksander Lesley	Jerzy Łuskina

Strength
A few thousand	300 soldiers and unknown number of Cossacks

The siege of Dorogobuzh took place in October 1632, during the Smolensk War. Russian forces under Fyodor Sukhatin and Aleksander Lesley managed to capture the fortress of Dorogobuzh, which was held by some 300 Polish-Lithuanian soldiers, supported by an unknown number of Zaporozhian Cossacks, loyal to the Polish–Lithuanian Commonwealth.

On 20 June 1632 the Zemsky Sobor declared war on Poland–Lithuania. The Russians hoped to recapture Smolensk and other territories which they had lost after the Polish–Muscovite War (1605–18). The Russians acted very slowly and their army did not leave Moscow until 9 August, crossing the border on 30 September. Altogether, the Russian Army had some 60 000 men, including a main force of 25 000 and 158 cannons, led by Mikhail Shein. Due to muddy ground, the march was slow, reaching Vyazma on 6 October. There, Shein ordered the front guard under Sukhatin and Lesley to march towards Dorogobuzh and capture the town, opening the way towards Smolensk.

In spring of 1632, upon the initiative of Voivode of Smolensk Aleksander Korwin Gosiewski, the fortifications of Dorogobuzh were reinforced. Its garrison consisted of a 100-strong unit of heavy cavalry, Polish infantry (200 men), and Cossacks. All forces were commanded by Jerzy Luskina. By 14 October the Russians burned most of the town, murdering many of its residents. The defenders retreated to a castle, located on a nearby hill, which fell on 28 October. Two days later main the Russian force under Shein arrived at Dorogobuzh. The captured fortress served as main supply base for the Russians.

== Sources ==
- Dariusz Kupisz, Smolensk 1632-1634, Bellona, 2001, ISBN 83-11-09282-6
