= Fyodor Volkonsky =

Fyodor Fyodorovich Volkonsky, Merin (Russian, Фёдор Фёдорович Волко́нский ) (died 1665) was a Russian statesman and boyar who led the Russian units during the Siege of Belaya in 1634 in time of Smolensk War. Voivode of Mtsensk in 1605. Son of Fedor Ivanovich Volkonsky, Merin ru:Волконский, Фёдор Иванович Мерин.
