= Chernihiv Voivodeship =

Administrative division in the Kingdom of Poland

Coordinates: 51°29′38″N 31°17′03″E

Czernihów Voivodeship Województwo czernihowskie Palatinatus Czernihoviensis
- Voivodeship of Poland
- 1635–1654
- coat of arms

- Chernihiv Voivodeship in the Polish–Lithuanian Commonwealth
- Capital: Czernihów
- History
  - Established: 1635
  - Disestablished: 1654
- Political subdivisions: counties: 2
| Preceded by | Succeeded by |
| Grand Duchy of Lithuania | Cossack Hetmanate |

Czernihów (Chernihiv) Voivodeship (Polish: Województwo czernihowskie) was a unit of administrative division and local government in the Kingdom of Poland (part of Polish–Lithuanian Commonwealth) from 1635 until Khmelnytsky Uprising in 1648 (technically it existed up until 1654). Also it was used as a fictitious title in the Commonwealth until the Partitions of Poland in 1772/1795. In 1635, Marcin Kalinowski was the first voivode (governor) of the Chernihiv Voivodeship.

The voivodeship was part of the Lesser Poland Province, and was divided into two counties: Czernihów and Nowogród Siewierski. Local sejmiks took place at Czernihów, and it had two senators in the Polish–Lithuanian Senate. Together with Kijów Voivodeship (Kyiv) and Bracław Voivodeship (Bratslav) it made the territory that came to be known as Ukraine.

== History ==
The history of Czernihow Voivodeship dates back to 1618, when after the Truce of Deulino, the Commonwealth gained control of the towns of Smolensk, Czernihow and Nowogród Siewierski. Since the truce was set to expire in 14.5 years, new acquisitions were not organized in official way. Smolensk was annexed by the Grand Duchy of Lithuania, while both Czernihow and Nowogrod became part of the Crown of the Kingdom of Poland forming the Duchy of Siveria. In 1633, during the Smolensk War, Polish Parliament (Sejm) introduced a bill in which both land court and starosta office were established at Czernihow. In 1634 the Treaty of Polyanovka confirmed that Czernihow remained part of Poland, so finally in 1635 the Sejm created the voivodeship, with two senators – the Voivode and the Castellan of Czernihow. Both county elected two deputies to the Sejm, and one deputy to the Lesser Poland Tribunal at Lublin. In 1637, construction of a fortress at Konotop began, whose purpose was to protect the newly acquired province. The fortress was completed in 1642.

The Commonwealth lost control of the province as early as 1648, during the Khmelnytsky Uprising. In the Treaty of Hadiach (1658), the Duchy of Ruthenia was created out of Czernihow Voivodship, Kiev Voivodeship and Bracław Voivodeship. The idea however was quickly abandoned, and after the Truce of Andrusovo (1667), Czernihow Voivodeship was annexed by the Tsardom of Russia.

The history of Czernihow Voivodeship does not end in 1667. Following the example of other provinces lost by the Commonwealth in the mid-17th century (e.g. Smolensk Voivodeship), the government in Warsaw continued to claim it as a titular voivodeship, with fictitious titles of voivode, senators, deputies and starostas named by the King, and remaining in use until the Partitions of Poland. The nobility of former Czernihow Voivodeship had its sejmiks at Wlodzimierz Wolynski. Last voivode of Czernihow was a man named Ludwik Wilga, nominated in 1783. In 1785, Stanisław August Poniatowski gave fictitious title of starosta of Nowogrod Siewierski to Tadeusz Czacki.

Zygmunt Gloger in his monumental book Historical Geography of the Lands of Old Poland gives a detailed description of Czernihow Voivodeship:

Czernihow on the Desna river is one of the eldest Slavic gord of Kievan Rus, as it was first mentioned in 907 (...) In 1238 it was captured and burned by the Tatars, after which the province of Czernihow – Nowogrod Siewierski turned into a ruin. Lithuanian Duke Algirdas captured this land in the mid-14th century, and it remained part of the Grand Duchy of Lithuania for the next 150 years (...) In 1493 (see also Muscovite–Lithuanian Wars), the province was captured by the Grand Principality of Moscow, where it remained until 1618. Officially, Czernihow belonged to the Commonwealth for 59 years, until 1667 (see also Truce of Andrusovo) (...) Since the 1618 Truce of Deulino was to expire after 16 years, the Commonwealth did not find it necessary to create a new voivodeship. Only after the Treaty of Polyanovka did the Sejm decide in 1635 to turn Duchy of Czernihow into Czernihow Voivodeship, with two counties, those of Nowogrod Siewierski and Czernihow. There were two starostas, local sejmik at Czernihow, and two senators. First voivode was named Marcin Kalinowski "in honor of his bloody deeds", while first castellan was Mikolaj Kossakowski (...) On 30 January 1667, the Commonwealth handed Czernihow over to the Tsardom of Russia, which was confirmed on 3 May 1686 in the Eternal Peace Treaty. Poland kept the titles of civil servants of Czernihow Voivodeship, and later on, the number of fictitious deputies was raised from 4 to 6.

== Seat and administrative division ==
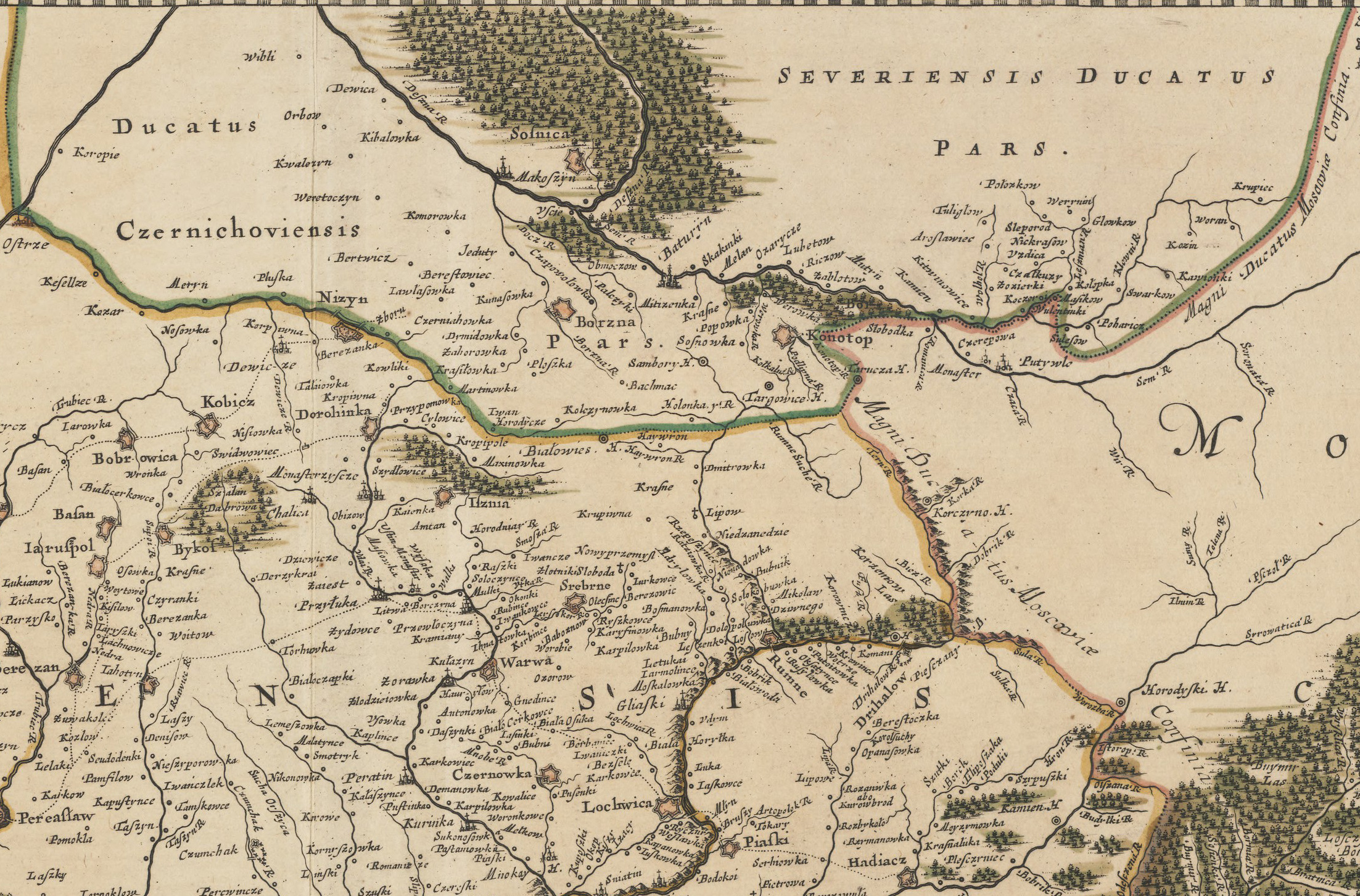
Ducatus Czernichoviensis (Duchy of Chernihiv) and Severiensis Ducatus (Duchy of Siveria). Fragment of Ukrainae pars quae Kiovia Palatinatus vulgo dicitur, based on Beauplan's Special Map of Ukraine.

Voivodeship Governor (Wojewoda) seat:

- Czernihów (Chernihiv)

Administrative divisions:

- Powiat Czernihów, a successor of the Principality of Chernihiv
- Powiat Nowogród Siewierski, a successor of the Principality of Novhorod-Siversky

== Voivodes ==
- Marcin Kalinowski 1602–1652
- Stefan Bieniewski 1598–1648
- Krzysztof Łohojski-Tyszkiewicz 1616–1666
- Stanisław Kazimierz Bieniewski 1611–1695
- Mariusz Stanisław Jaskólski 1624–1683
- Jan Gniński 1650–1703
- Otto Fryderyk Felkerzamb 1641–1705
- Franciszek Jan Załuski 1660–1735
- Mikołaj Franciszek Krosnowski 1652–1723
- Piotr Jan Potocki 1679–1726
- Józef Lubomirski 1680–1732
- Józef Remigian Potulicki 1732–1734
- Jakub Florian Narzymski 1690–1759
- Piotr Michał Miączyński 1695–1776
- Franciszek Antoni Ledóchowski 1755–1835
- Ludwik Wilga, died 1797
