= Krzysztof Radziwiłł =

Polish–Lithuanian noble (1585–1640)

- Prince; Grand Hetman of Lithuania
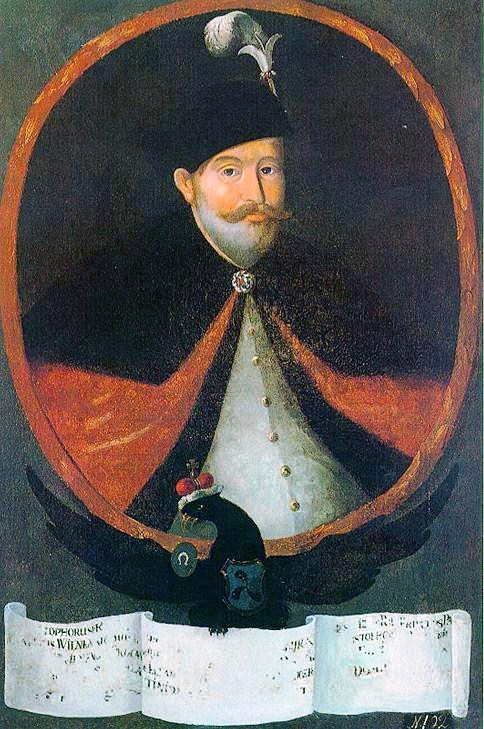
- Born: 22 March 1585; Biržai, Grand Duchy of Lithuania
- Died: 19 November 1640 (aged 55); Svėdasai, Grand Duchy of Lithuania
- Noble family: Radziwiłł
- Spouse: Anna Kiszka
- Issue: with Anna Kiszka: Janusz Radziwiłł; Katarzyna Radziwiłł
- Father: Krzysztof "Piorun" Radziwiłł
- Mother: Katarzyna Tęczyńska

Prince Krzysztof Radziwiłł (Lithuanian: Kristupas Radvila; 22 March 1585 – 19 November 1640) was a Polish–Lithuanian noble (szlachcic), magnate, politician and military commander of his epoch. Sometimes referred to as Krzysztof Radziwiłł II, to distinguish him from his father, Krzysztof "Piorun" Radziwiłł.

== Biography ==
Owner of Biržai, he was Field Lithuanian Hetman from 1615, Castellan of Vilnius from 1633, Voivode of Vilnius from 1633. Grand Lithuanian Hetman from 1635, starost of Mogilev, Bystrzyca, Žiežmariai and Seje. In 1632 he served as Marshal of the Sejm.

He successfully fought in Livonia against Sweden from 1600s to 1617. He took part in the campaign against the Swedes in the Baltic region in 1621–1622 (Polish-Swedish War), where he agreed to a controversial truce (as he had no permission to negotiate it from the king or the Sejm). Important commander of the Grand Ducal Lithuanian Army during the Smolensk War, where he was instrumental in obtaining the capitulation of the Russian army in the relief of Smolensk. Afterwards, in 1635, he retired from his military career, concentrating on administering his estates. A Calvinist, he was a great protector of Protestants in Lithuania.

He was an opponent of Catholic king Sigismund III Vasa, but a supporter of his more tolerant son, Władysław IV. An advocate of Władysław's marriage to a Protestant princess, he distanced himself from the king after Władysław declined this marriage proposal. He opposed an alliance between the Commonwealth and the Habsburgs. On his lands in Kėdainiai he founded a major Calvinist cultural and religious centre, which flourished till the 19th century as a center of the Lithuanian Reformed Church. His large horse stables were famous throughout Europe.

== Collector ==
Radziwiłł collected various curiosities at the Lubcha Castle: minerals, mollusc shells, corals, hunting trophies, whale bones, elephant tusk, nut shells, and similar items. It is believed that at least three items (moose horn collection, a chair made of horns, and a jaw bone of bowhead whale) of the collection are preserved at the Zoological Museum of Vilnius University.
