= Battle of Smolensk =

Battle of Smolensk may refer to:

- Battle of Smolensk (1812), during Napoleon's invasion of Russia
- Battle of Smolensk (1941), encirclement and capture of the Soviet 16th and 20th armies by German Army Group Centre
- Battle of Smolensk (1943), recapture of the city by the Soviet 39th, 43rd and 10th Guards armies
- The Battle of Smolensk, 1839 painting by Jean-Charles Langlois

== See also ==
- Siege of Smolensk (disambiguation)
