= Smolensk War =

1632–34 Polish–Lithuanian defeat of Russia

- Part of Russo-Polish wars and Thirty Years' War in Eastern Europe
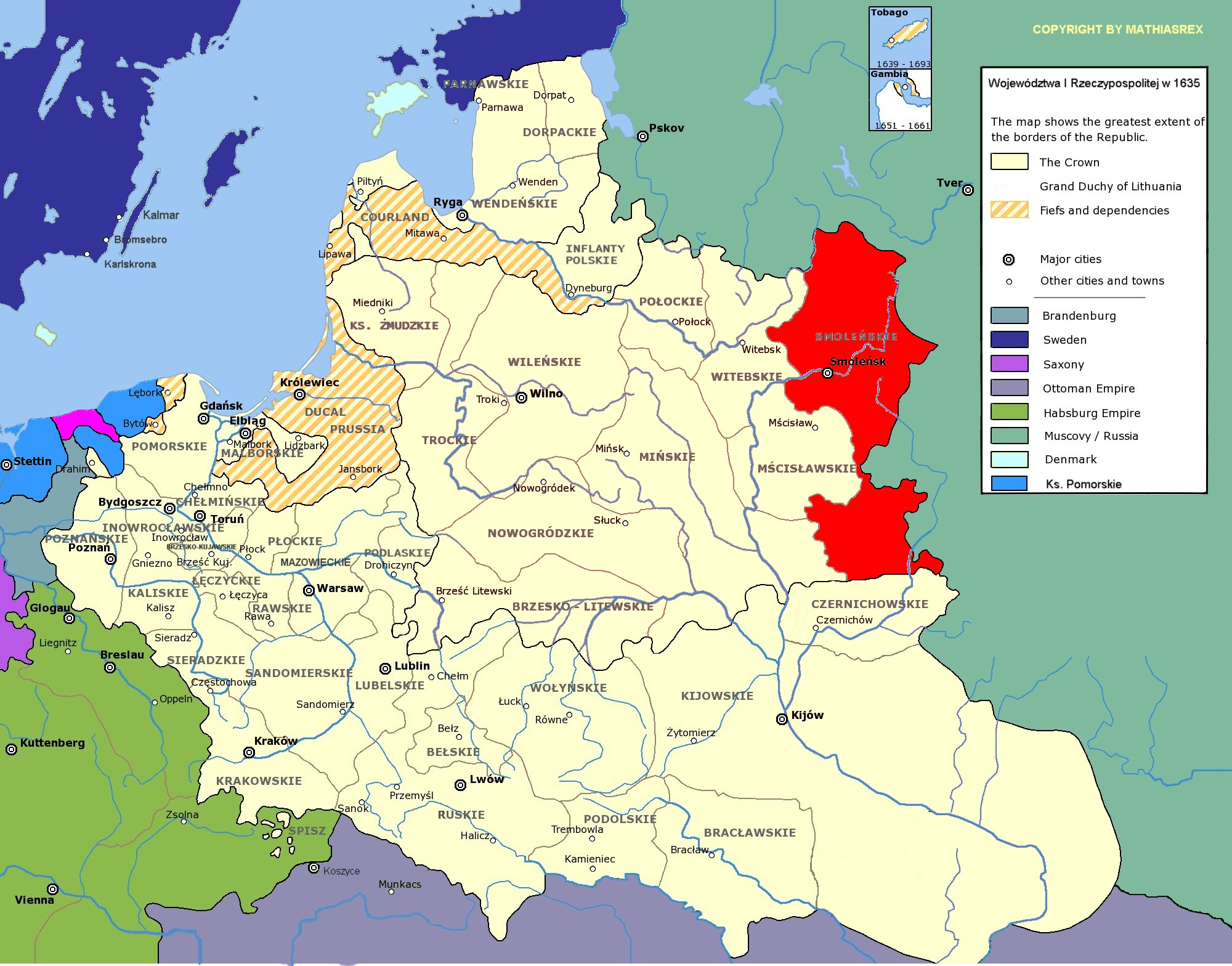
- Smolensk Voivodeship, showing in red the disputed territory.
Date	Autumn 1632 – Spring 1634
Location	Smolensk Voivodeship, Polish–Lithuanian Commonwealth
Result	Polish–Lithuanian victory (Treaty of Polyanovka)
Territorial changes	Russian failure to retake Smolensk.; Russia receives Serpeysk (Note: To encourage Russia to join the anti-Swedish alliance)

Belligerents
Polish–Lithuanian Commonwealth; Zaporozhian Cossacks	Tsardom of Russia

Commanders and leaders
(Polish–Lithuanian Commonwealth) Władysław IV Vasa (Polish–Lithuanian Commonwealth) Krzysztof Radziwiłł	Mikhail Shein (executed)

Strength
30,000–35,000; 3,120 hussars 260 Cossack cavalry 1,700 Western cavalry 10,500 Western infantry 1,040 dragoons 2,200 Polish infantry Few thousand of Zaporozhian Cossacks infantry	35,000

Casualties and losses
Unknown	27,000

The Smolensk War (1632–1634) was fought between the Polish–Lithuanian Commonwealth and Russia.

Hostilities began in October 1632 when Russian forces tried to capture the city of Smolensk. Small military engagements produced mixed results for both sides, but the surrender of the main Russian force in February 1634 led to the Treaty of Polyanovka. Russia accepted Polish–Lithuanian control over the Smolensk region, which lasted for another 20 years.

== Background ==
In 1632, Sigismund III Vasa, the king of Poland and Grand Duke of Lithuania, died. Although the Commonwealth nobility quickly elected Sigismund's son Władysław IV Vasa as their new ruler, Poland's neighbours, expecting delays in the electoral process, tested the Commonwealth's perceived weakness. Swedish king Gustav II Adolph sent envoys to Russia and the Ottoman Empire to propose an alliance and war against the Commonwealth.

During Russia's Time of Troubles, the Commonwealth had defeated Russia in the last Russo-Polish War and took Smolensk and Chernihiv Voivodeships in the Truce of Deulino, but the Truce expired in 1632. Władysław IV had also refused to relinquish his claim to the throne in Moscow.

The Commonwealth was not ready for war. In 1631, the royal army numbered barely 3,000 men; the Smolensk garrison was about 500 strong, and most garrisons in the border area were composed not of regular or mercenary soldiers but of 100 to 200 local volunteers. Aware that Russia was preparing for war, in the spring of 1632 the Sejm (Polish–Lithuanian parliament) increased the army by recruiting an additional 4,500 men; by mid-1632 the deputy voivode (podwojewoda) of Smolensk, Samuel Drucki Sokoliński, had about 500 volunteers from pospolite ruszenie and 2,500 regular army soldiers and Zaporozhian Cossacks. In May the Senate of Poland agreed to increase the size of the army, but Grand Lithuanian Hetman Lew Sapieha objected, arguing that the current forces were enough and that war was not likely. Nonetheless the Field Lithuanian Hetman Krzysztof Radziwiłł recruited an additional 2,000 soldiers.

Russia, having recovered to a certain extent from the Time of Troubles, agreed with the assessment that the Commonwealth would be weakened by the death of its king, and unilaterally attacked without waiting for the Swedes and the Ottomans. Russia's aim was to gain control of Smolensk. Smolensk was the capital of the Commonwealth's Smoleńsk Voivodeship, but it had often been contested, and it changed hands many times during the 15th, 16th and 17th centuries (from the days of the Muscovite–Lithuanian Wars). A major supporter of the war was the Tsar's father, Patriarch Filaret, who represented the anti-Polish camp at court. Inspired by the Zemsky Sobor's (Russian parliament's) call for vengeance and reclamation of lost lands, the Russian army sallied west.

== Hostilities ==
The Russian army that crossed the Lithuanian border in early October 1632 had been carefully prepared and was under the experienced command of Mikhail Borisovich Shein, who had previously defended Smolensk against the Poles during the 1609–1611 siege. Several towns and castles fell as the Russians advanced, and on 28 October 1632 (the same day that the historic town of Dorogobuzh was taken), Shein moved to begin the siege of Smolensk.

Currently, Russia's strength in the war is a matter of dispute among historians, with estimates ranging from 30,000 34,500, to 35,000 with 160 artillery pieces. Compared to former Russian armies, Shein's army was significantly modernised. Dissatisfied with their traditional formations of musket-equipped infantry (the streltsy), the Russians looked to foreign officers to update the equipment and training of their troops based on the Western European model of regulars, dragoons, and reiters. Eight such regiments, totaling 14,000 to 17,000 men, comprised part of Shein's army.

=== Siege of Smolensk ===
Commonwealth forces in Smolensk were composed of the Smolensk garrison (about 1,600 men with 170 artillery pieces under the command of the Voivode of Smolensk, Aleksander Korwin Gosiewski), strengthened by the local nobility, which formed a pospolite ruszenie force of about 1,500 strong. The city's fortifications had also recently been improved with Italian-style bastions.

Shein constructed lines of circumvallation around the fortress. Using tunnels and mines, his forces damaged a long section of the city wall and one of its towers. Russian heavy artillery, mostly of Western manufacture, reached Smolensk in December 1632 with even heavier guns arriving the following March. After a preliminary artillery bombardment, Shein ordered an assault, which was repulsed by the Polish defenders. Nonetheless the siege was progressing; Smolensk's fortifications were being eroded, and the defenders were suffering heavy casualties and running out of supplies. By June 1633, some soldiers started to desert, and others talked of surrender.

Despite these difficulties, the city, commanded by Deputy Voivode Samuel Drucki-Sokoliński, held out throughout 1633 while the Commonwealth, under its newly elected King Władysław IV, organised a relief force. The Sejm had been informed about the Russian invasion by 30 October 1632, and, starting in November, had discussed the possibility of relief. However, the process was delayed until the spring of 1633, when the Sejm officially sanctioned a declaration of war and authorised a large payment (6.5 million zlotys, the highest tax contribution during Władysław's entire reign) for the raising of a suitable force. The intended relief force would have an effective strength of about 21,500 men and would include: 24 chorągiews of Winged Hussars (~3,200 horses), 27 chorągiews of light cavalry—also known as Cossack cavalry but not composed of Cossacks—(3,600 horses), 10 squadrons of raitars (~1,700 horses), 7 Lithuanian petyhor regiments (~780 horses), 7 large regiments of dragoons (~2,250 horses), and ~20 regiments of infantry (~12,000 men). Over 10,000 of the infantry would be organized based on the Western model, previously not common in Commonwealth armies.

Meanwhile, Field Hetman of Lithuania and Voivode of Vilnius, Krzysztof Radziwiłł, and Voivode Gosiewski established a camp about 30 kilometres (18.6 mi) from Smolensk, moving from Orsha to Bajów and later, Krasne. By February 1633, they had amassed around 4,500 soldiers, including over 2,000 infantry, and were engaged in raiding the rear areas of the Russian besiegers to disrupt their logistics. Hetman Radziwiłł also managed to break through the Russian lines on several occasions, bringing about 1,000 soldiers and supplies into Smolensk to reinforce the fortress and raising the defenders' morale.

By the summer of 1633, the relief force, led personally by the king and numbering about 25,000 (20,000 in the Polish–Lithuanian army, according to Jasienica), arrived near Smolensk; they reached Orsha on 17 August 1633. By the first days of September, the main body of the relief forces approaching Smolensk numbered around 14,000. The Russian army, recently reinforced, numbered 25,000. Only when Cossack reinforcements, led by Tymosz (Timofiy) Orendarenko and numbering between 10,000 and 20,000, arrived on 17 September would the Commonwealth army gain numerical superiority. The Cossacks under Orendarenko and Marcin Kazanowski raided the Russian rear lines, freeing the Polish–Lithuanian units under Radziwiłł and Gosiewski to join the effort to break the siege.

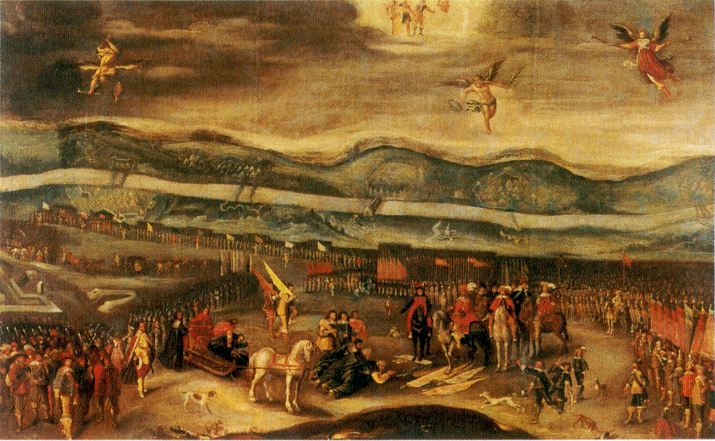
Surrender of Mikhail Shein at Smolensk, painted by Christian Melich, 1640s

Władysław's brother, John II Casimir, commanded one of the regiments in the relief army. Another notable commander was the Field Crown Hetman, Marcin Kazanowski. King Władysław IV, a great supporter of the modernization of the Commonwealth army, proved to be a good tactician, and his innovations in the use of artillery and fortifications based on Western ideas greatly contributed to the eventual Polish–Lithuanian success. He had replaced the old arquebusiers with musketeers, and standardized the Commonwealth artillery (introducing 3- to 6-pounder regimental guns), both to great effect.

Commonwealth's cavalry, including the Winged Hussars, significantly restricted Russian mobility, forcing them to stay in their trenches. In a series of fierce engagements, Commonwealth forces gradually overran the Russian field fortifications, and the siege reached its final stages by late September. On 28 September 1633, Commonwealth forces took the main Russian supply points, and by 4 October the siege had broken.

Shein's army retreated to its main camp, which was in turn surrounded by Commonwealth forces in mid-October. The besieged Russians waited for relief, but none arrived, as Commonwealth and Cossack cavalry had been sent to disrupt the Russian rear. Some historians also cite dissent and internal divisions in the Russian camp as responsible for their inaction and ineffectiveness. (Jasienica blames the Russian warlords, and Parker the foreign mercenaries.) The Tatar invasion threatening the south Russian borderlands was a contributory factor, with many soldiers and boyars from those regions deserting the Russian camp to return to protect their homeland. Some foreign mercenaries also deserted to the Commonwealth side.

Shein began surrender negotiations in January 1634, and by February they were in full swing. The Russians finally signed a surrender treaty on 25 February 1634, and on 1 March they vacated their camp. (Some scholars, such as Rickard and Black, give the date of 1 March for Shein's capitulation.) Under the surrender terms, the Russians had to leave behind most of their artillery but were allowed to retain their banners after a ceremony in which they were laid before King Władysław. They also had to promise not to engage Commonwealth forces for the next three months. Shein's forces numbered around 12,000 at the time of their capitulation, but over 4,000, including most of the foreign contingent, immediately decided to defect to the Commonwealth.

=== Other engagements ===
Several other towns and fortresses in the region were the site of smaller battles. Russian forces captured several significant locations during their advance in 1632, but Nagielski speculates that the delay in the arrival of their main force and artillery at Smolensk caused by this dilution of effort may have cost them the siege and consequently the war. In July 1633, the Russians took the towns of Polatsk, Velizh, Usvyat, and Ozerishche. Polatsk was the scene of particularly heavy fighting as the Russians captured the city and part of the fortress. However, attacks on Vitebsk and Mstsislaw were successfully repulsed. Polish forces laid siege to Putivl, but due to the desertion of their Cossack allies they were forced to withdraw.

In the autumn of 1633, Commonwealth forces retook Dorogobuzh, an important Russian supply point after its capture the year before. This setback wrecked Russian plans to send reinforcements to Shein's army, although in any event the Russians did not begin to gather a 5,000-strong army for that purpose until January 1634. Also that autumn, Grand Crown Hetman Stanisław Koniecpolski defeated an Ottoman incursion in the south of the Commonwealth, freeing his force to lay siege to the Russian town of Sevsk; although Koniecpolski failed to take the fortress, he tied down large Russian forces, preventing them from moving north towards Smolensk.

After the relief of Smolensk in the spring of 1634, the Commonwealth army moved towards the fortress Belaya. However, the siege of Belaya turned to a fiasco although the king manage to capture Vyazma.

== Treaty of Polyanovka ==
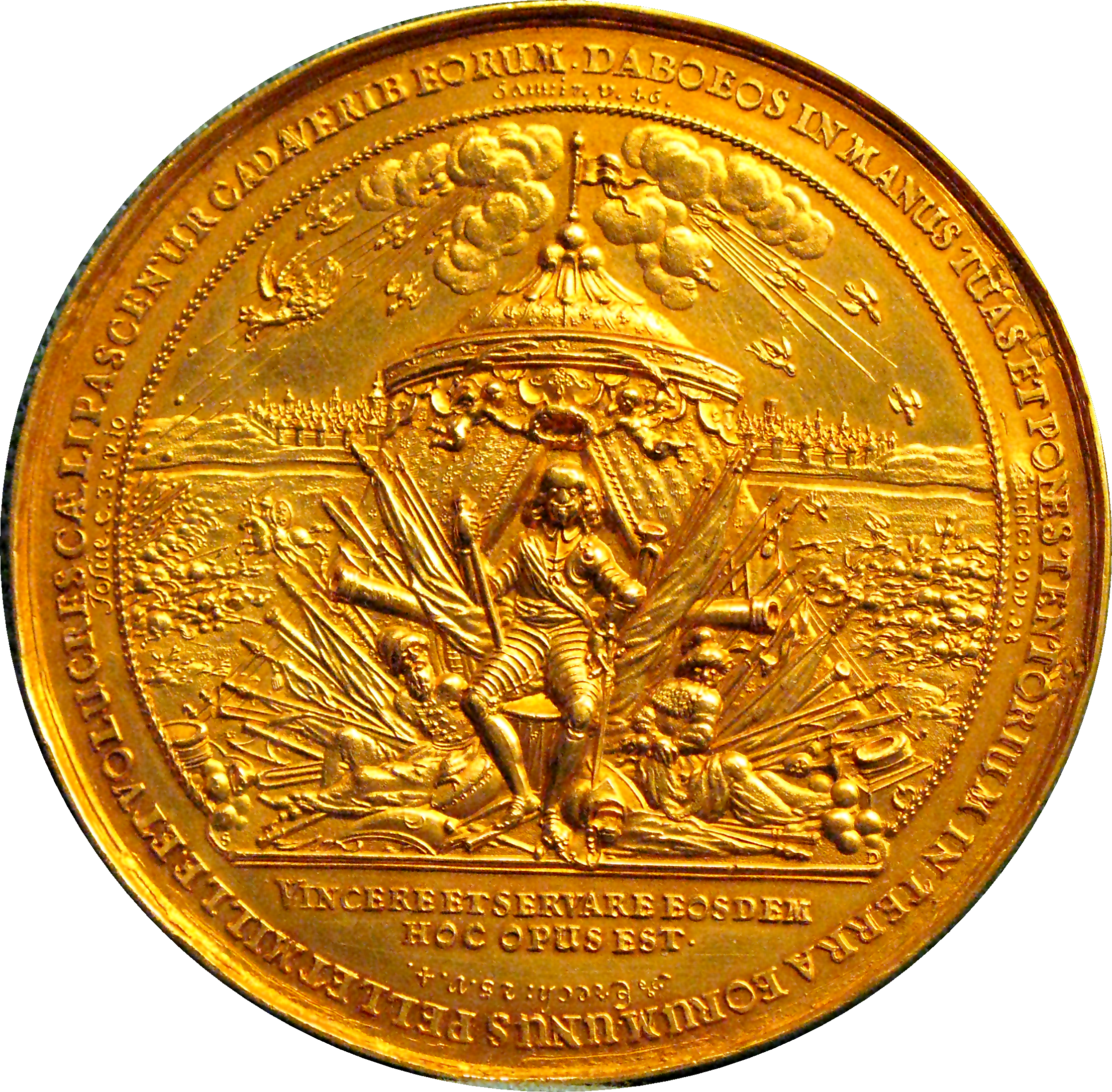
Medal commemorating the victory of Władysław IV over Russia in Smolensk in 1634.

By the spring of 1634, the Russians had not only lost Shein's army but were threatened by Tatar raids that ravaged southern Russia. Patriarch Filaret had died the previous year, and without him, the war fervour lessened. Even before the end of 1633, Tsar Michael of Russia was considering how best to end the conflict. Because he had once been elected Tsar of Russia and could realistically lay claim to the Russian throne, King Władysław wanted to continue the war or, because the Polish-Swedish Treaty of Altmark would soon be expiring, ally with the Russians to strike against Sweden. However, the Sejm wanted no more conflict. As Stanisław Łubieński, the Bishop of Płock, wrote two weeks after Shein's surrender: "Our happiness is in remaining within our borders, guaranteeing health and well-being." With neither side keen on prolonging the war, they began negotiating, not for an armistice but for "eternal peace."

Talks began on 30 April 1634, and the Treaty of Polyanovka was signed in June, putting an end to hostilities. The treaty confirmed the pre-war status quo, with Russia paying a large war indemnity (20,000 rubles in gold), while Władysław agreed to surrender his claim to the Russian throne and return the royal insignia to Moscow. Jasienica notes that from the Russian perspective it was likely that Władysław's abnegation of his claim was more important, in terms of the subsequent increase in internal stability, than the loss of disputed borderland. Despite not winning militarily, the Russians may have scored a diplomatic triumph. Other authors, such as Hellie, support this interpretation.

== Aftermath ==
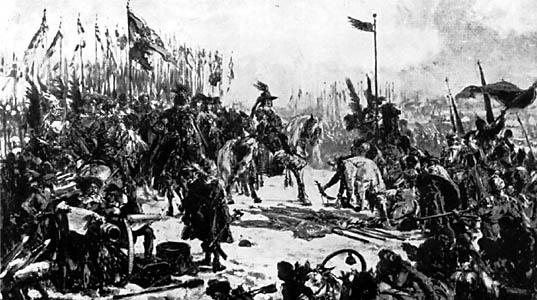
King Władysław IV on horseback near Smolensk after seizing the Smolensk Fortress, painting by Jan Matejko, lost during the Second World War

Already during the later stages of the war, when the Commonwealth army moved from Smolensk to Bely, a new threat begun to loom on the southern borders, where the Ottoman Empire was massing an invasion force. Thus Władysław began redirecting his reinforcements to that theater. Later that year, the Commonwealth forces under Stanisław Koniecpolski scored a victory in the south, ending a war against the Ottomans.

Both sides introduced new tactics, units and equipment based on Western models, but the Polish–Lithuanian forces proved more adept with these innovations than the Russians. However, the main factors that kept the Russians from winning were the delay in moving siege artillery to Smolensk and the severe disruption of Russian supply lines by Polish cavalry. A scapegoat was nevertheless needed: Mikhail Shein was accused of treason and, together with his second-in-command Artemy Izmaylov and the latter's son Vasily, executed in Moscow on April 28, 1634. Learning from this defeat, the Russians would adopt new and more successful tactics in the Polish–Russian War (1654–1656).

After the war, Władysław gave the Russians the border town of Serpeysk and nearby territories, hoping to persuade the Tsar to join in an anti-Swedish alliance. However, the king was ultimately unable to overcome objections from the Polish–Lithuanian Sejm, who were unwilling to fight Sweden after the Treaty of Sztumska Wieś. The Russians, unable to see benefit in such an alliance, were also unenthusiastic, and the proposed alliance came to nothing.

The war cost the Commonwealth treasury about 4,300,000 zlotys.

The Battle of Smolensk is commemorated on the Tomb of the Unknown Soldier, Warsaw, with the inscription "SMOLENSK 18 X 1632–25 II 1634".

== See also ==
- Polish–Ottoman War (1633–1634)
- Thirty Years' War (1618–1648)
