= Dorogobuzhsky District =

Dorogobuzhsky District Дорогобужский район (Russian)
- District
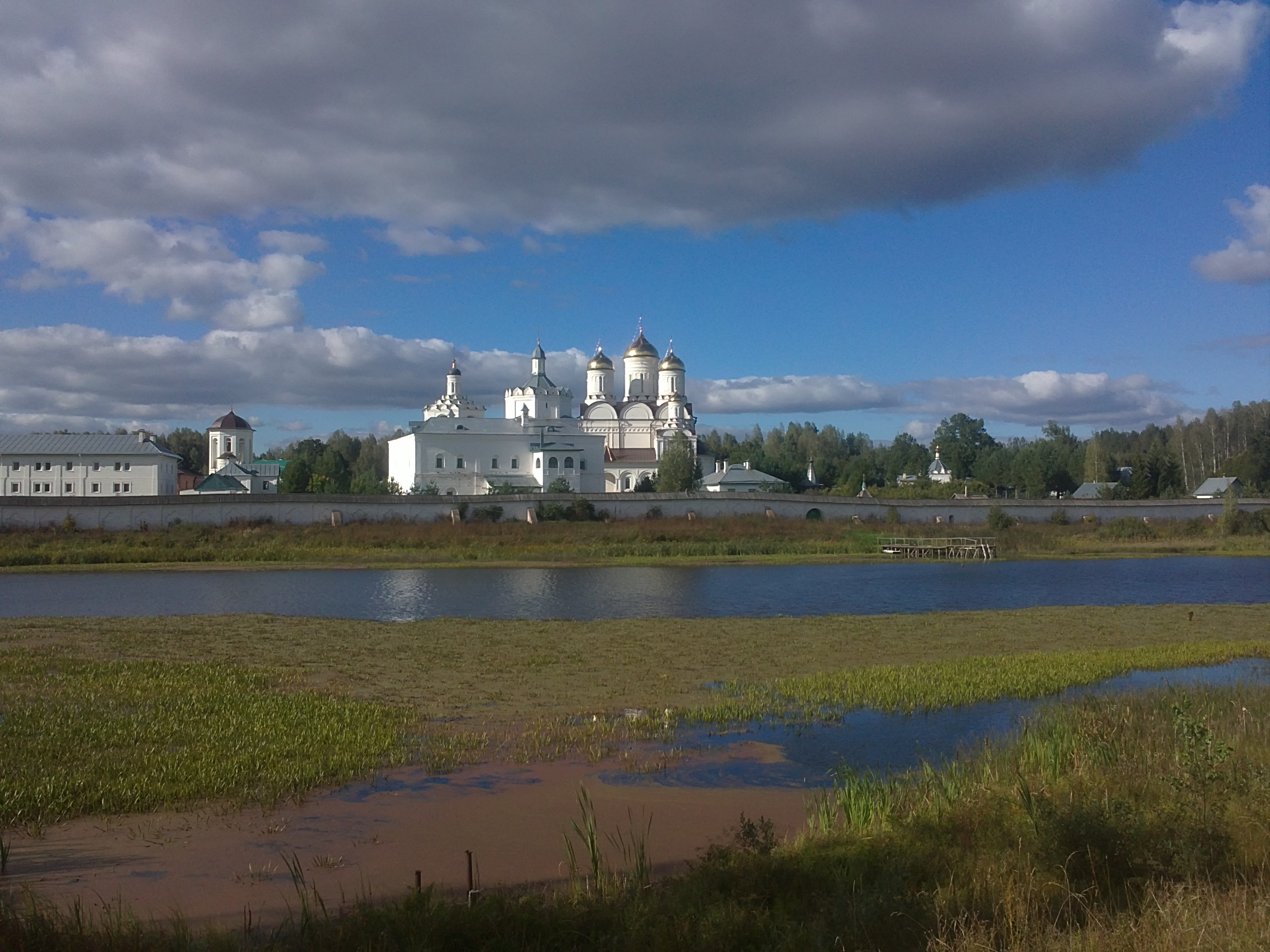
- Trinity Monastery, Dorogobuzhsky District

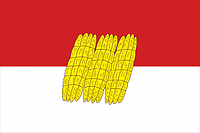
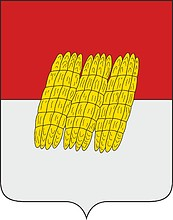
- Flag Coat of arms
- Location of Dorogobuzhsky District in Smolensk Oblast
- Coordinates: 54°55′N 33°18′E
- Country: Russia
- Federal subject: Smolensk Oblast
- Established: 1929
- Administrative center: Dorogobuzh

Area
  - Total: 1,771.99 km^{2} (684.17 sq mi)

Population (2010 Census)
  - Total: 29,077
  - Density: 16.409/km^{2} (42.500/sq mi)
  - Urban: 81.5%
  - Rural: 18.5%

Administrative structure
  - Administrative divisions: 1 Urban settlements (towns), 1 Urban settlements (urban-type settlements), 12 Rural settlements
  - Inhabited localities: 1 cities/towns, 1 urban-type settlements, 123 rural localities

Municipal structure
  - Municipally incorporated as: Dorogobuzhsky Municipal District
  - Municipal divisions: 2 urban settlements, 12 rural settlements
- Time zone: UTC+3 (MSK)
- OKTMO ID: 66614000
- Website: https://dorogobyzh.admin-smolensk.ru/

Dorogobuzhsky District (Russian: Дорогобу́жский райо́н) is an administrative and municipal district (raion), one of the twenty-five in Smolensk Oblast, Russia. It is located in the center of the oblast. The area of the district is 1,771.99 square kilometers (684.17 sq mi). Its administrative center is the town of Dorogobuzh. Population: 29,077 (2010 Census); 32,672 (2002 census); 36,016 (1989 Soviet census). The population of Dorogobuzh accounts for 36.9% of the district's total population.

== Sights ==
The 18th-century estate of Aleksino used to be reputed for its stud-farm of Orlov stallions. The Boldin Monastery, dating from the 15th century, was renovated by the Godunov family in the late 16th century. The Godunovs commissioned a five-domed cathedral, a tented refectory, and a pillar-like bell-tower to be built there. According to Pyotr Baranovsky, the abbey represented the best-preserved 16th-century monastery complex in Eastern Europe. It was blown up by the retreating Germans in 1943 but was partly rebuilt in the 1990s.
