= Mikhail Shein =

Russian noble

Mikhail Borisovich Shein (Russian: Михаил Борисович Шеин, [ˈʂɛ.ɪn]) (c.1570 – May 8 [O.S. 3 May] 1634) was a leading Russian general during the reign of Tsar Mikhail Romanov. Despite his tactical skills and successful military career, he ended up losing his army in a failed attempt to besiege Smolensk and being executed for this defeat. The first Russian generalissimo, Aleksey Shein, was his great grandson.

He left behind diaries, one of which is kept at the National Archives of Sweden, providing historical detail on the siege of Smolensk until his surrender in 1634.

== Revolts and awards ==
In the years 1602–1603 he put down peasant revolts, and in 1606–1607, revolt of Ivan Bolotnikov. For that, in 1605 he was promoted to okolnichy, and around late 1606 / early 1607 – to a boyar. In 1607 he also became the voivode of Smolensk.

== First siege of Smolensk ==
Shein's prominence dates from 1607, when he was made a boyar and sent to govern the key western stronghold of Smolensk. It was he who commanded the Russian contingent for 20 months of its siege by the Poles. On midnight June 3, 1611, the Poles, led by a traitor, stormed the fortress. Shein put up a fierce resistance, but finally capitulated to Polish General Potocki. He was tortured in order to discover where the people of Smolensk concealed their fabulous treasures. For the following 9 years he was imprisoned in Warsaw together with his family.

Shein was allowed to return to Moscow in 1619, accompanying another illustrious captive, Patriarch Philaret. Subsequently, he became one of the latter's most trusted advisers. During the 1620s, Shein led the canon prikaz and took part in various secret negotiations. The fame of his former exploits at Smolensk made his standing second to none.

== Later siege of Smolensk ==
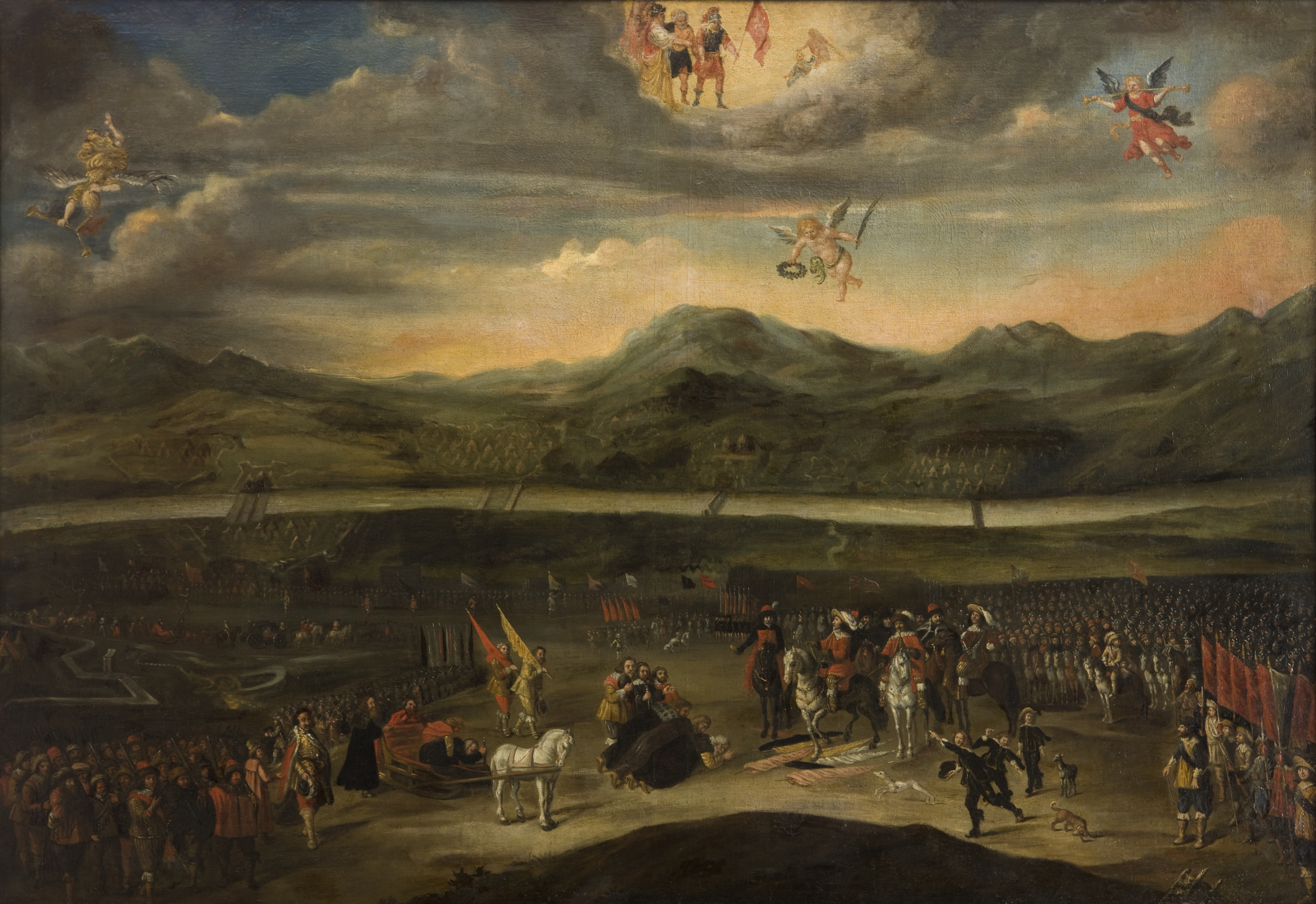
Surrender of Mikhail Shein following the Siege of Smolensk (1632–1633)

The new hostilities against Poland broke out in 1632, and Shein at once led the Russian army to wrestle Smolensk from the Polish control. The new siege lasted for 10 months, and the victory seemed not a long way off, when king Wladyslaw IV with a small force fought off the Russians from the walls of Smolensk and captured their provisions in Dorogobuzh. Shein's foreign subordinates feuded with each other, their troops being decimated by epidemics, while a large portion of Russian soldiers deserted to their home villages. The position of Shein became very perilous, as the long-awaited reinforcement dallied in Mozhaysk. On February 15, 1634, he was constrained to surrender his army to the enemy, amid consternation from the tsar and boyars, who were astonished that the much-anticipated war was being lost.

== Execution ==
Back in Moscow, Shein was accused of incompetence and high treason and tried by the Boyar Duma. He was found guilty and executed on April 28, 1634. His estates were confiscated and his family exiled.
