= Truce of Deulino =

1619 peace between Poland-Lithuania and Russia

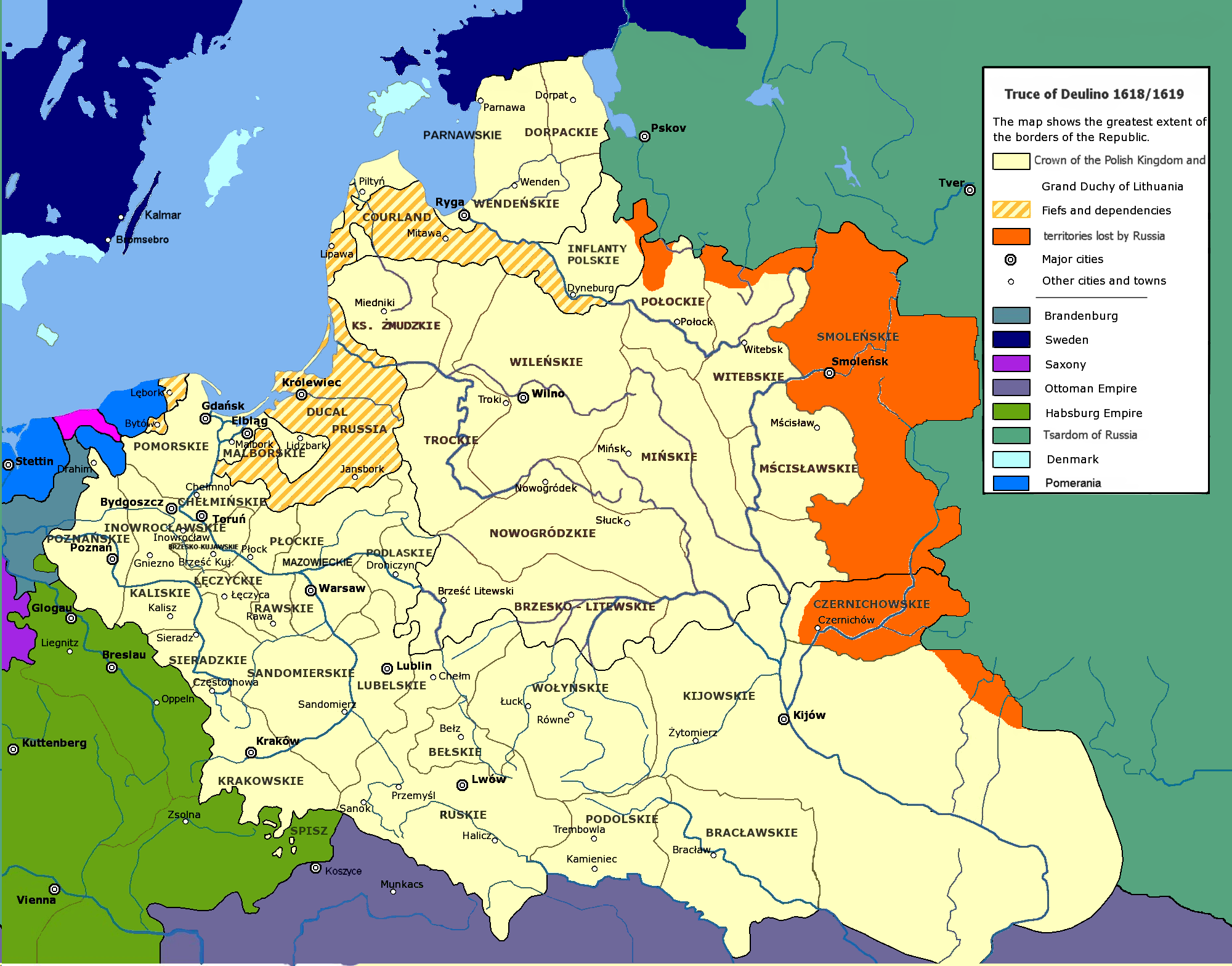
Territories marked in orange were gained by the Polish–Lithuanian Commonwealth. Much of these territories, including the city of Smolensk, used to belong to the Grand Duchy of Lithuania before its union with the Kingdom of Poland. They would later be re-conquered by the Tsardom of Russia in the second half of the 17th century as per the terms of the Treaty of Andrusovo.

The Truce of Deulino (also known as Peace or Treaty of Dywilino) concluded the Polish–Russian War of 1609–1618 between the Polish–Lithuanian Commonwealth and the Tsardom of Russia. It was signed in the village of Deulino on 11 December 1618 and took effect on 4 January 1619.

The agreement marked the largest geographical expansion of the Commonwealth (0.99 million km^{2}), which lasted until the Commonwealth conceded the loss of Livonia in 1629. The Commonwealth gained control over the Smolensk and Chernihiv Voivodeships. The truce was set to expire within 14.5 years. The parties exchanged prisoners, including Filaret Romanov, Patriarch of Moscow.

Władysław IV, son of Commonwealth king Sigismund III Vasa, refused to relinquish his claim to the throne in Moscow. Therefore, in 1632, when the Truce of Deulino expired and Sigismund III died, hostilities were immediately resumed in the course of a conflict known as the Smolensk War, which ended in the Treaty of Polyanovka in 1634.
