= Battle of Drohiczyn =

1194 battle

Date	1192
Location	Drohiczyn
Result	Polish victory

Belligerents
Yatvingians; Kievan Rus'; Cumanians	Kingdom of Poland

Commanders and leaders
	Casimir II the Just

The Battle of Drohiczyn (Polish: Bitwa pod Drohiczynem) took place in 1192 near the village of Drohiczyn between the allied Yotvingian and Kievan Rus' forces that raised Polish Rebels against the opposing Kingdom of Poland army led by Duke Casimir II the Just. The Polish army won the battle.
