= Dorogobuzh =

Town in Smolensk Oblast, Russia

Dorogobuzh Дорогобуж
- Town
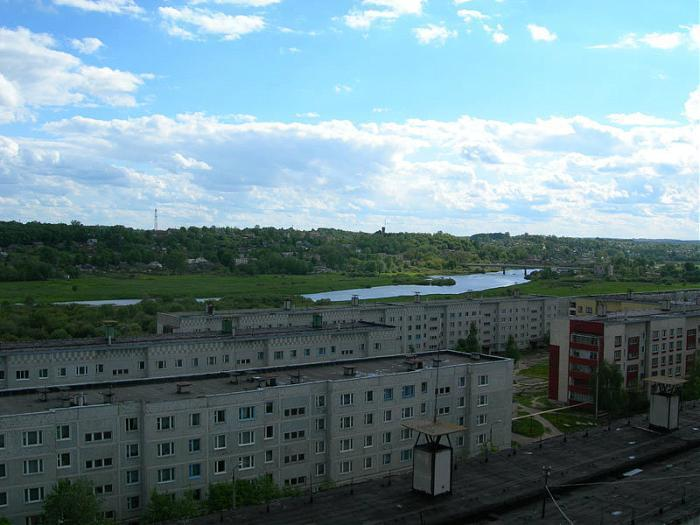
- View of Dorogobuzh. The Dnieper River can be seen in the background.

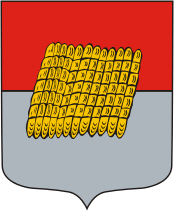
- Flag Coat of arms
- Interactive map of Dorogobuzh
- Location of Dorogobuzh Dorogobuzh (Smolensk Oblast)
- Coordinates: 54°55′N 33°18′E
- Country: Russia
- Federal subject: Smolensk Oblast
- Administrative district: Dorogobuzhsky District
- Urban settlementSelsoviet: Dorogobuzhskoye
- First mentioned: 1150

Area
  - Total: 35.15 km^{2} (13.57 sq mi)
- Elevation: 210 m (690 ft)

Population (2010 Census)
  - Total: 10,720
  - Estimate (2024): 9,086 (−15.2%)
  - Density: 305.0/km^{2} (789.9/sq mi)

Administrative status
  - Capital of: Dorogobuzhsky District, Dorogobuzhskoye Urban Settlement

Municipal status
  - Municipal district: Dorogobuzhsky Municipal District
  - Urban settlement: Dorogobuzhskoye Urban Settlement
  - Capital of: Dorogobuzhsky Municipal District, Dorogobuzhskoye Urban Settlement
- Time zone: UTC+3 (MSK)
- Postal codes: 215710, 215713
- OKTMO ID: 66614101001
- Website: web.archive.org/web/20140714152735/http://admin.smolensk.ru/~dorogob/g_dor.html

Dorogobuzh (Russian: Дорогобуж; Belarusian: Дарагабуж) is a historic town and the administrative center of Dorogobuzhsky District in Smolensk Oblast, Russia, straddling the Dnieper River and located 125 kilometers (78 mi) east of Smolensk, the administrative center of the oblast. Population: 10,720 (2010 census); 12,250 (2002 census); 12,254 (1989 Soviet census).

== History ==
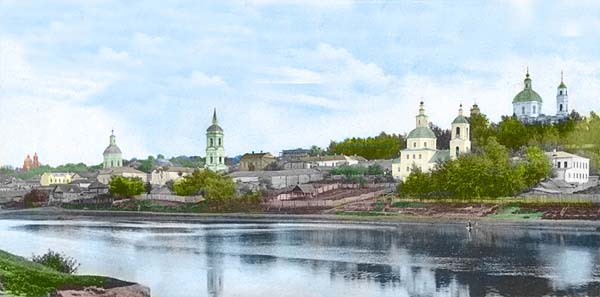
Pre-1917 view of the Dnieper River in Dorogobuzh

First mentioned in 1150, it was established as a fortress defending eastern approaches to Smolensk. It was located in the Principality of Smolensk, which in 1404 became part of Lithuania. It passed to the Grand Duchy of Moscow after the Battle of Vedrosha in 1500. In 1508, Vasily III sent Italian masters to build a wooden fort there.

During the Time of Troubles, Dorogobuzh passed between Lithuania and various Muscovite factions several times, and was ravaged, with its population reduced to ten people in 1614. It was captured by Russia in 1613, and then re-captured by Polish Prince Władysław IV Vasa in 1617. Within the Polish–Lithuanian Commonwealth, it was part of the Smolensk Voivodeship. During the Smolensk War, in 1632, it was besieged and captured by Russia, however, it was restored to the Polish–Lithuanian Commonwealth by the Treaty of Polyanovka in 1634. In 1667, it passed to Russia.

During the Napoleonic Wars, it was captured by French troops in August 1812, and re-captured by Russia in October 1812. In the late 19th century, the town held an annual fair for grain, horses and cattle.

Dorogobuzh was occupied by the German Army during World War II first from October 5, 1941 to February 15, 1942 (when it was liberated by three partisan detachments and some Soviet troops), then again from June 7, 1942 to September 1, 1943. From 1941 to 1943, the Germans operated a forced labour camp in the town, and in April-May 1942 also the Dulag 184 prisoner-of-war camp.

== Administrative and municipal status ==
Within the framework of administrative divisions, Dorogobuzh serves as the administrative center of Dorogobuzhsky District. As an administrative division, it is incorporated within Dorogobuzhsky District as Dorogobuzhskoye Urban Settlement. As a municipal division, this administrative unit also has urban settlement status and is a part of Dorogobuzhsky Municipal District.

== Geography ==
=== Climate ===
Dorogobuzh has a warm-summer humid continental climate (Dfb in the Köppen climate classification).

Climate data for Dorogobuzh
Month	Jan	Feb	Mar	Apr	May	Jun	Jul	Aug	Sep	Oct	Nov	Dec	Year
Mean daily maximum °C (°F)	−4.7 (23.5)	−3.9 (25.0)	1.6 (34.9)	10.7 (51.3)	17.2 (63.0)	20.3 (68.5)	23 (73)	21.4 (70.5)	15.7 (60.3)	8.4 (47.1)	2.2 (36.0)	−1.9 (28.6)	9.2 (48.5)
Daily mean °C (°F)	−6.8 (19.8)	−6.4 (20.5)	−1.7 (28.9)	6.3 (43.3)	13 (55)	16.5 (61.7)	19.2 (66.6)	17.6 (63.7)	12.2 (54.0)	5.8 (42.4)	0.4 (32.7)	−3.7 (25.3)	6.0 (42.8)
Mean daily minimum °C (°F)	−9.2 (15.4)	−9.3 (15.3)	−5.4 (22.3)	1.2 (34.2)	7.7 (45.9)	11.7 (53.1)	14.6 (58.3)	13.3 (55.9)	8.4 (47.1)	3.2 (37.8)	−1.5 (29.3)	−5.8 (21.6)	2.4 (36.4)
Average precipitation mm (inches)	51 (2.0)	45 (1.8)	44 (1.7)	45 (1.8)	76 (3.0)	83 (3.3)	91 (3.6)	80 (3.1)	65 (2.6)	69 (2.7)	55 (2.2)	50 (2.0)	754 (29.8)
Source: https://en.climate-data.org/asia/russian-federation/smolensk-oblast/dorogobuzh-32859/
