= Serpeysk =

Serpeysk Серпейск
- Rural locality
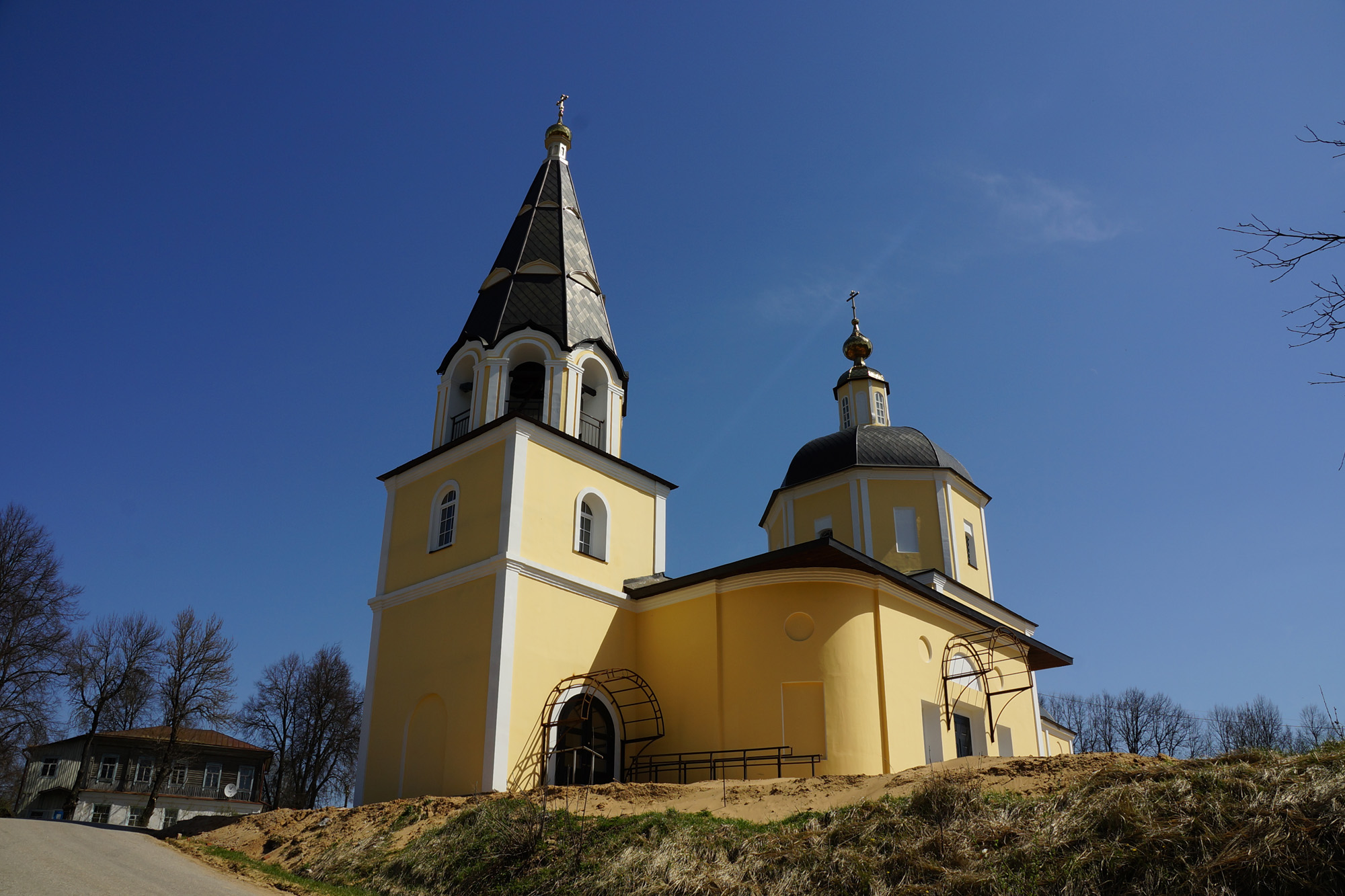
- Saint Nicholas church

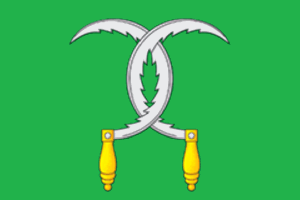
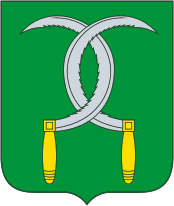
- Flag Coat of arms
- Interactive map of Serpeysk
- Location of Serpeysk Serpeysk (European Russia) Serpeysk (Russia)
- Coordinates: 54°20′07″N 34°59′20″E
- Country: Russia
- Federal subject: Kaluga Oblast
- Administrative district: Meshchovsky District
- First mentioned: 1406

Population (2010 Census)
  - Total: 658
  - Estimate (2021): 615 (−6.5%)
- Time zone: UTC+3 (MSK)
- Postal code: 249246
- OKTMO ID: 29627440101

Serpeysk (Russian: Серпейск; Belarusian: Сярпейск, romanized: Siarpiejsk; Polish: Sierpiejsk) is a selo in Meshchovsky District of Kaluga Oblast, Russia, located on the Serpeyka River.

The locality has a canting arms, depicting two sickles, with Russian: серп, Polish: sierp meaning sickle.

== History ==
It was first noted in 1406 as a military fort of the Grand Duchy of Lithuania on its border with Muscovy. Later on, it was annexed to Muscovy by Ivan III of Russia, then recaptured by the Polish–Lithuanian Commonwealth, and eventually incorporated into Muscovite Russia after the signing of Treaty of Polyanovka which marked the end of the Smolensk War in 1634. Once stripped of its garrison, the town dwindled into oblivion and became of supernumerary town category. The oldest surviving buildings are two churches, one dating from 1771 and the other constructed in the 1780s. In the late 19th century, it had a population of 1,818.

In October 1941, during World War II, German forces seized the town and held it until January 1942.

== Demographics ==
Distribution of the population by ethnicity according to the 2021 census:

	percent
Russians	89.76%
Armenians	4.55%
Moldovans	0.98%
Ukrainians	0.81%
Germans	0.81%
Belarusians	0.49%
