= Treaty of Polyanovka =

1634 peace treaty between Russia and Poland-Lithuania

- Polish–Lithuanian Commonwealth after the treaty
- Type: Peace treaty
- Drafted: 30 April–14 June 1634
- Signed: 14 June 1634
- Location: Polanów, Polish–Lithuanian Commonwealth (now Polyanovka, Russia)
- Parties: Polish–Lithuanian Commonwealth Tsardom of Russia

The Treaty of Polyanovka, also known as the Peace of Polyanovka (Polish: Pokój w Polanowie; Lithuanian: Polianovkos taika; Belarusian: Палянаўскі мір, romanized: Palyanaǔki mir) was a peace treaty signed on 14 June 1634 between the Polish–Lithuanian Commonwealth and the Tsardom of Russia in the village of Semlyovo located near the Polyanovka river between Vyazma and Dorogobuzh.

The accord was signed in the aftermath of the Smolensk War. The negotiations began on 30 April after the failure of the Polish-Lithuanian siege of Belaya. Overall, the agreement confirmed the pre-war status quo, with Russia paying a large war indemnity (20,000 rubles in gold) for Władysław IV agreeing to surrender his claim to the Russian throne and return the royal insignia to Russia. Władysław, despite holding an upper hand, was trying to bring Russia into an anti-Sweden alliance; hence in a gesture of goodwill he agreed to give the Russians the border town of Serpeysk and nearby territories. However, the alliance never came through, as the Polish-Lithuanian Sejm, unwilling to fight Sweden after the Treaty of Sztumska Wieś, subsequently objected, and Russians saw no benefit in such an alliance. The sides also reached an agreement on prisoner exchange and a trade treaty.

The treaty ended the almost unbroken series of wars between the Commonwealth and its neighbours that had been waged since the beginning of the 17th century.
