= Smolensk Voivodeship =

Voivodeship of the Grand Duchy of Lithuania

Coordinates: 54°46′58″N 32°02′43″E

Smolensk Voivodeship Palatinatus smolencensis Województwo smoleńskie
- Voivodeship of the Grand Duchy of Lithuania, later Polish–Lithuanian Commonwealth
- 1508–1667
- Coat of arms

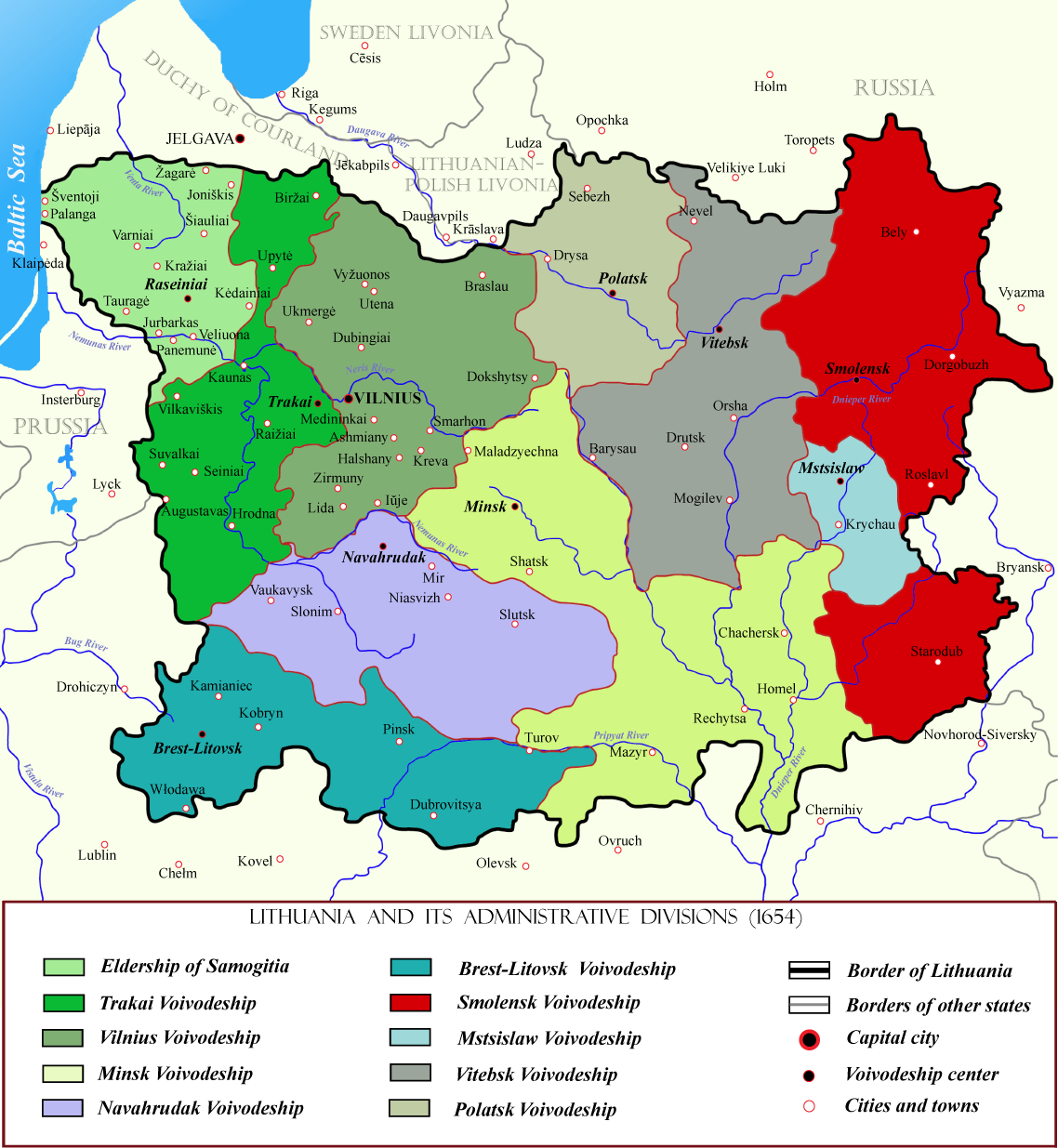
- Smolensk Voivodeship in red. Voivodeship's borders did not change since the Union of Lublin.
- Smolensk Voivodeship in the Polish–Lithuanian Commonwealth
- Capital: Smolensk
- History
  - Established: 1508
  - Truce of Andrusovo: 1667
- Political subdivisions: counties: two
Preceded by	Succeeded by
Principality of Smolensk	Smolensk Governorate
- Today part of: Russia

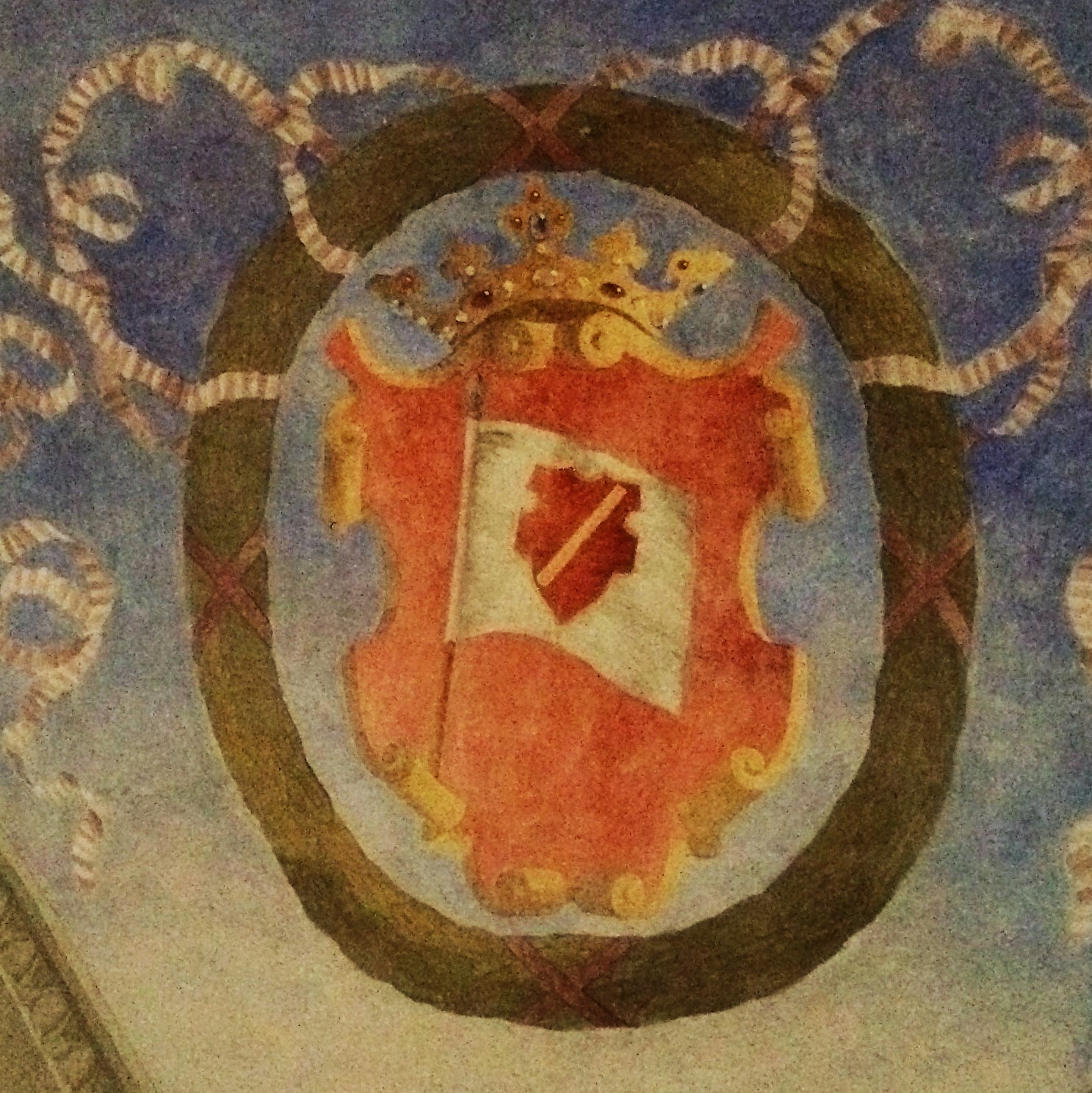
Old Chamber of Deputies (Royal Castle, Warsaw)

Smolensk Voivodeship (Latin: Palatinatus smolencensis; Belarusian: Смаленскае ваяводзтва; Polish: Województwo smoleńskie; Lithuanian: Smolensko vaivadija; Russian: Смоленское воеводство) was a unit of administrative division and local government in the Grand Duchy of Lithuania and later the Polish–Lithuanian Commonwealth.

== History ==
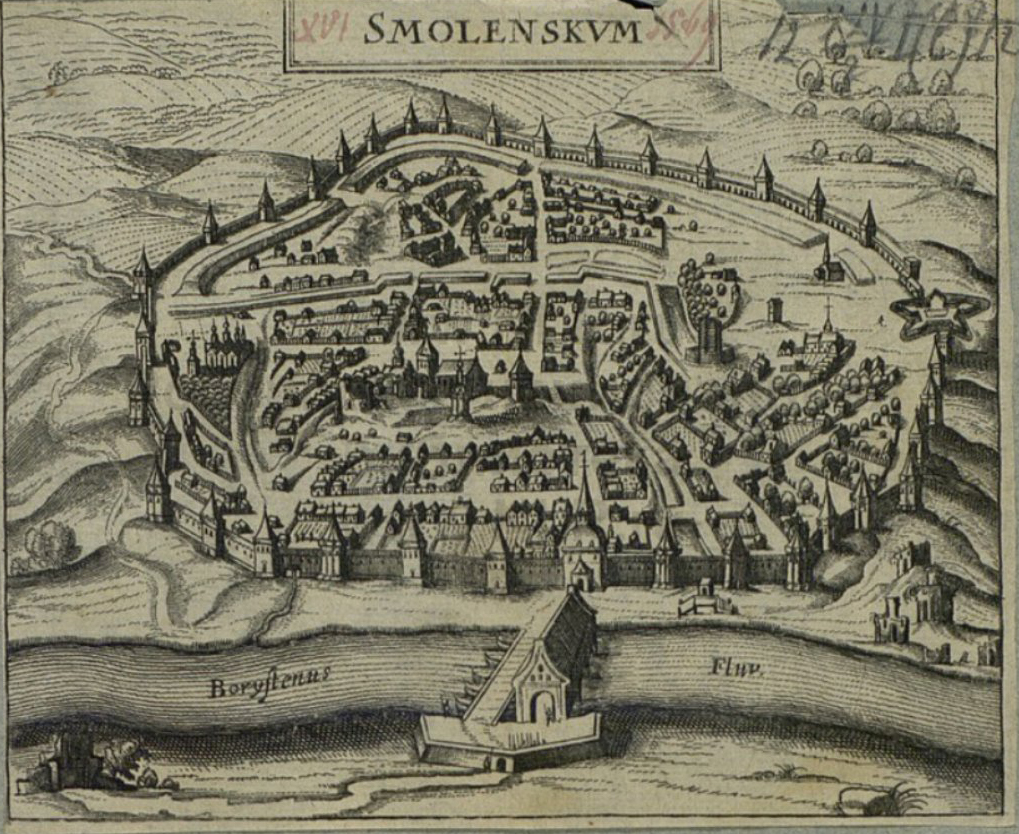
Smolensk, capital of the voivodeship, in 1627

The territory of Smolensk was part of the Grand Duchy of Lithuania since 1404, but the voivodeship was established only in 1508. Just six years later, in 1514, it was lost to the Grand Duchy of Moscow during the Muscovite–Lithuanian Wars. The voivodeship was recaptured by the Commonwealth in 1611 during the Polish–Muscovite War (1605–18) and lost again in 1654 during the Russo-Polish War (1654–67). Even when the territory was under Russian control, Poland and Lithuania claimed it as a titular voivodeship. The capital of the voivodeship, and the seat of its governor (voivode), was in Smolensk. It was subdivided into two powiats: Smolensk and Starodub.

Zygmunt Gloger in his monumental book Historical Geography of the Lands of Old Poland provides this description of the Smolensk Voivodeship:

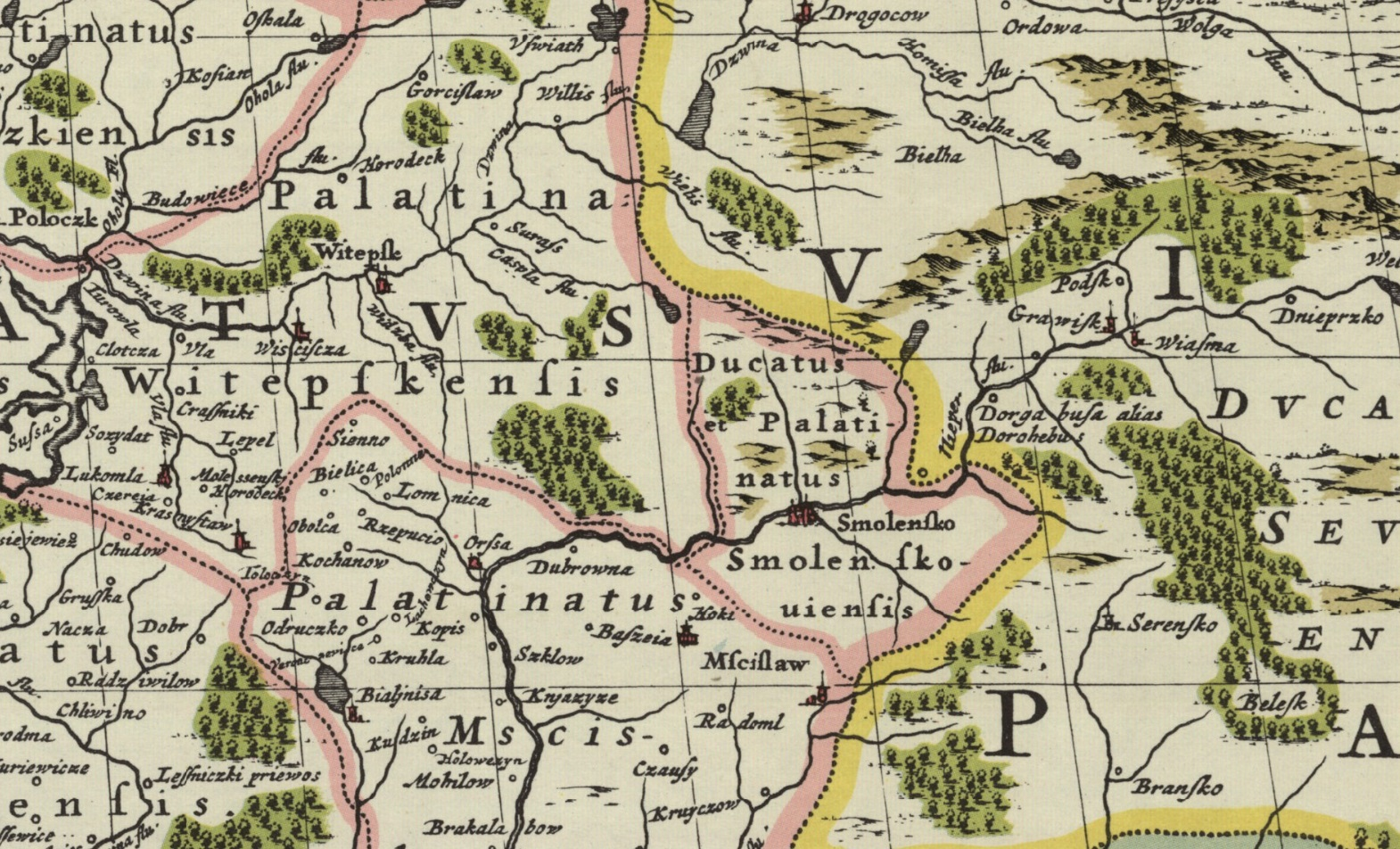
Palatinatus Smolenskouiensis - Smolensk Voivodeship in 1659 (map by F. de Wit) with visible Smolensk.

In the 9th century, Smolensk was the main center of the Krivichs. In the 11th century, it became the capital of a separate duchy, the Principality of Smolensk, which in the 14th century was conquered by the Grand Duchy of Lithuania. In 1404, it became a permanent part of Lithuania, and later on, the Principality was turned into a Voivodeship. In 1514, Smolensk was captured by Muscovy, which was confirmed by a 1522 treaty. For the next 89 years Smolensk belonged to Muscovy. It was recovered by King Sigismund III of Poland in 1611, but Smolensk Voivodeship as part of the Commonwealth existed only for 56 years. In 1654 it was recaptured by the Russians, which was confirmed by the Truce of Andrusovo in 1667.

Smolensk Voivodeship had three senators: the Bishop, the Voivode, and the Castellan of Smolensk. It was divided into two counties: those of Smolensk and Starodub. After its final annexation by Russia, it continued to exist as a voivodeship in exile, with sejmiks taking place at a Bernardine Church in Vilnius. Furthermore, the title of Bishop of Smolensk remained in use. The last titular Bishops before the partitions of Poland were Adam Naruszewicz, and Tymoteusz Gorzeński.

== See also ==
- Prince of Smolensk
