= Nobility privileges in Poland =

Pre-1795 political system

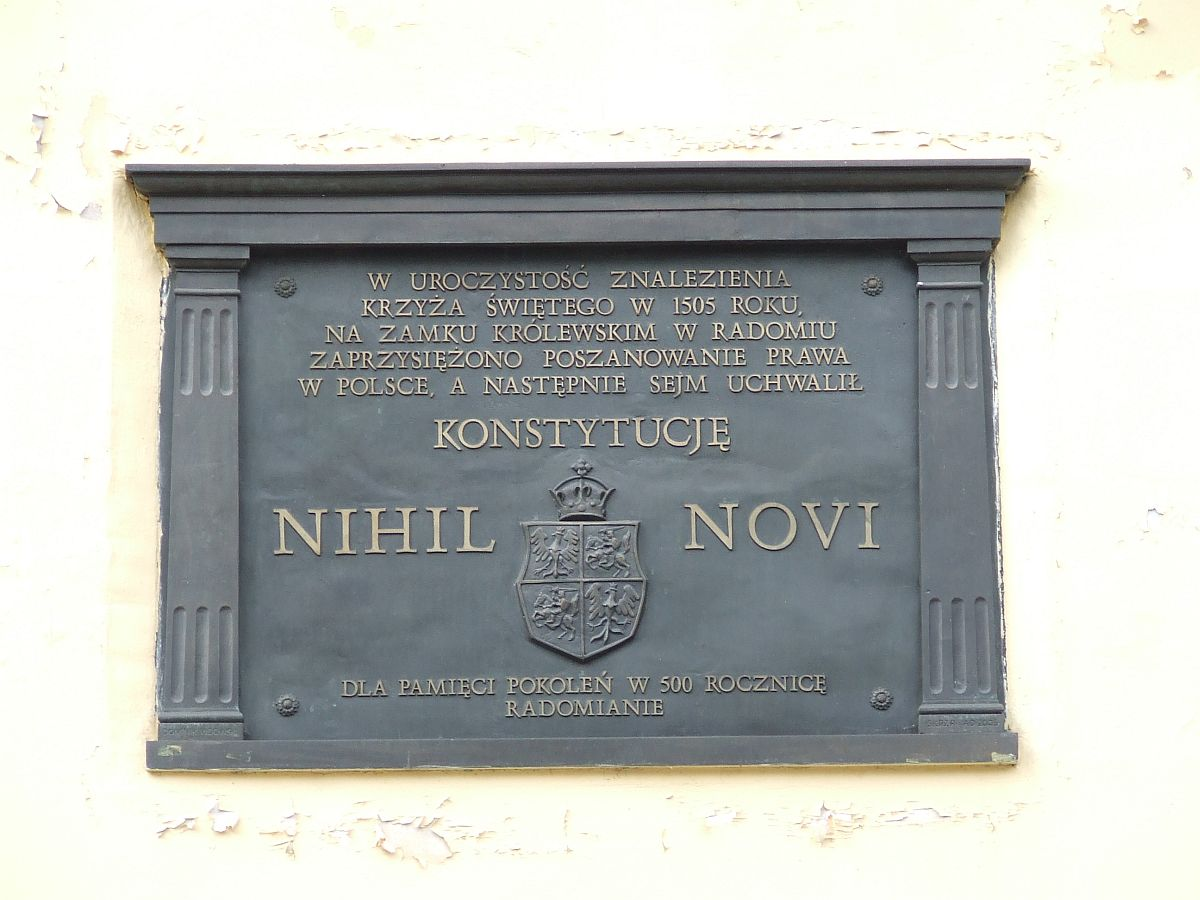
Plaque at Radom Castle, commemorating the 500th anniversary of adoption there, in 1505, of the Act of Nihil novi

The privileges of the szlachta (Poland's nobility) formed a cornerstone of "Golden Liberty" in the Kingdom of Poland (before 1569) and, later, in the Polish–Lithuanian Commonwealth (1569-1795). Most szlachta privileges were obtained between the late-14th and early-16th centuries. By the end of that period, the szlachta had succeeded in garnering numerous rights, empowering themselves and limiting the powers of the elective Polish monarchy to an extent unprecedented elsewhere in Europe at the time.

== Genesis ==
The privileges of the szlachta are linked to the rise of the nobility as a social class in Poland, and to the weakening of the monarchy during the period of Poland's political fragmentation, coupled with the institution of elective monarchy (see royal elections in Poland).

== Development ==
Before the mid-14th century when the Polish monarchs granted privileges to Polish nobles, they did so on a provincial basis. The Privilege of Cienia, which was bestowed by Władysław Laskonogi in 1228, was the first such privilege and was conferred upon knights of the Lesser Poland province. However, with the rise of the unified szlachta class, the way in which privileges were granted began to change. As a class, the szlachta first acquired country-wide privileges in the mid-14th century, with the first one being the Privilege of Buda, issued by Casimir the Great in 1355. Under the terms of this privilege, the king promised not to levy any extraordinary taxes, and to compensate the nobles for any losses they suffered on his behalf while fighting abroad.

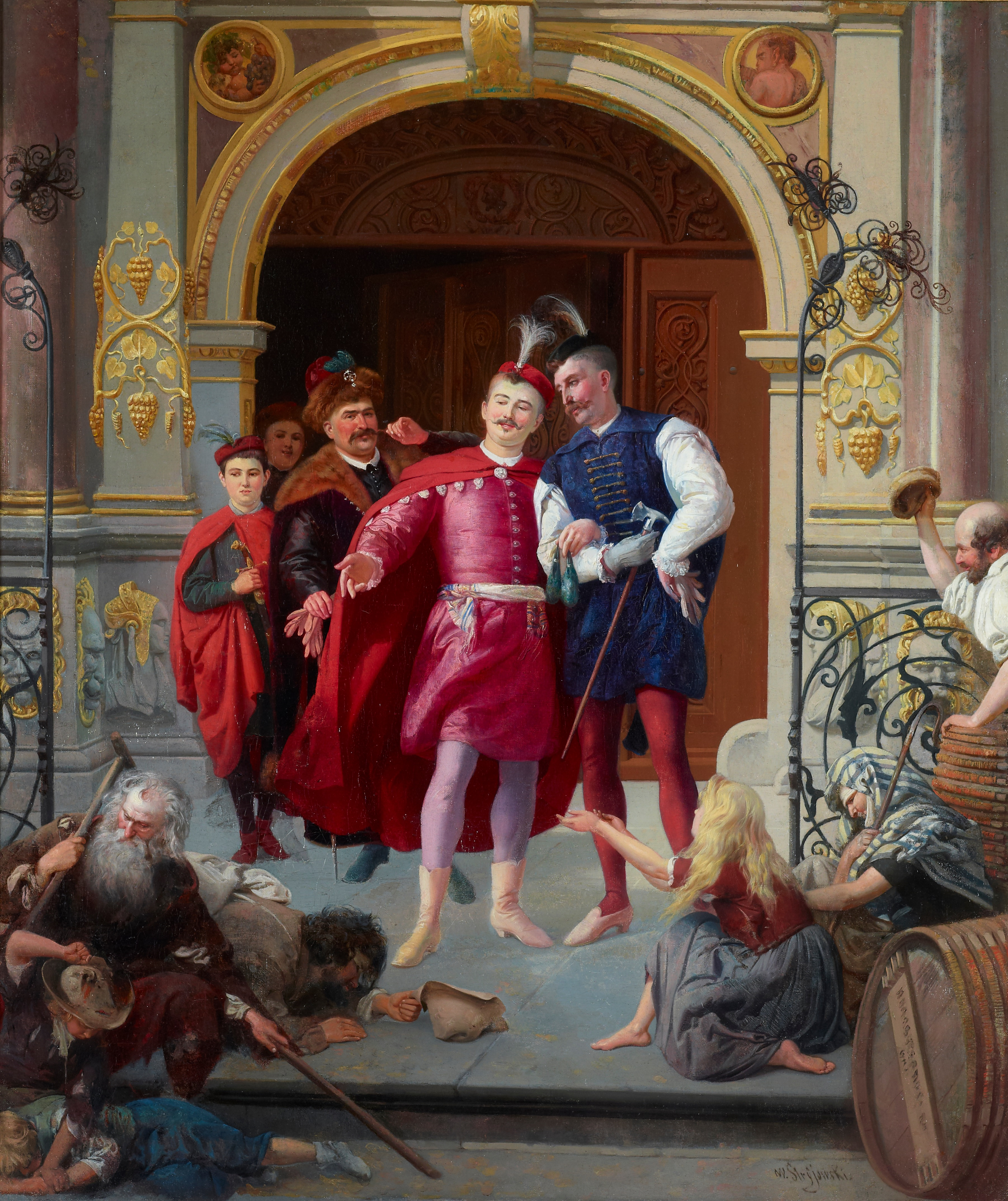
Polish szlachta nobles in Gdańsk. Painting by Wilhelm August Stryowski.

Another milestone privilege came in 1374 when Louis I of Hungary issued the Privilege of Koszyce, under which the king promised not to levy any taxes without agreement from the szlachta. From this, the nobles derived considerable leverage in their future dealings with the monarchy. Louis also promised to pay the ransom for any nobles taken into captivity during wars abroad and promised that the nobles would not have to aid in the construction of castles unless they gave prior agreement for such a project to begin. This privilege also stated that the king had a duty to ensure that the country did not lose any territories, and regulated some issues related to the posting of officials. Finally, the king promised that the office of starosta would only be given to Poles and that the offices of a given province (ziemia) would only be given to the local nobles.

From 1387, soon after the beginning of the Polish–Lithuanian union, the privileges of the Polish nobility were notionally extended to the Grand Duchy of Lithuania. It would take several centuries, though, for the various elements of the Polish political system to be fully introduced in Lithuania.

The Privilege of Czerwińsk from 1422 issued by King Władysław Jagiełło granted the nobility a promise that the king would not confiscate their estates without permission from the juridical court, and that the courts would operate on the basis of the written law. It also introduced the principle of incompatibilitas, limiting the ability of individuals to combine numerous offices. Finally, the right to mint money had to gain the acceptance of the royal council.

More privileges were granted by Jagiełło through the Statute of Warta in 1423, which most notably declared the equality of all nobles. This Statute also increased the nobles' power over the peasantry by limiting the peasants' right to leave their villages, and giving the nobles the right to buy out the lands of sołtys (peasant leaders).

The Privilege of Jedlnia and Kraków (1425, 1430, 1433), also issued by Jagiełło, granted the nobility the right of personal safety, making them immune from prosecution unless a proper warrant was issued by a court of justice. This was enshrined in the principle of nullum terrigenam possessionatum capiemus, nisi judicio rationabiliter fuerit convictus, or in short, neminem captivabimus. Nobles also received a guarantee that all of the high offices, including Church positions, would only be given to those of their class. Finally, the nobility received important rights with regards to control over the military: levying the pospolite ruszenie, the Polish levée en masse, could not be done without their consent, and service abroad had to be compensated by the king.

The Privilege of Cerkwica, granted in 1454 and confirmed the same year by the Statutes of Nieszawa, required the king to seek the nobles' approval at sejmiks, the local parliaments, when issuing new laws, levying the pospolite ruszenie, or imposing new taxes. This empowerment of the sejmiks marked the beginning of the Polish nobles' democracy (see Golden Liberty). This was expanded upon in 1496 through the Privilege of Piotrków (or Statutes of Piotrków). Issued by King Jan Olbracht, this privilege increased the nobles' position, albeit while reducing that of the peasantry and the townsfolk. While the nobles were granted a monopoly on owning and buying land outside cities and towns, the right of peasants to leave the land was further reduced, and noble judiciary powers over the peasantry were increased. This privilege was a milestone towards the era of serfdom in Poland; some historians list it as the event that marks the introduction of serfdom to Poland.

In 1501, King Aleksander Jagiellończyk signed the Privilege of Mielnik, through which he gave the legislative initiative to the Senate of Poland. This privilege empowered the magnates who sat in the Senate, but it did not last long, as it was repealed by the general sejms (Poland's parliament) of 1504 and 1505. Nevertheless, another milestone in the development of the nobles' democracy was achieved in 1505 with the establishment of the constitutional principle of nihil novi, or Nihil novi nisi commune consensu ("Nothing new without the general consent"). This privilege vastly empowered the entire general sejm (of which the Senate was a part) instead of just the Senate; its crucial part was the statement that no law could be passed without the approval of the entire sejm.

== Final privileges ==
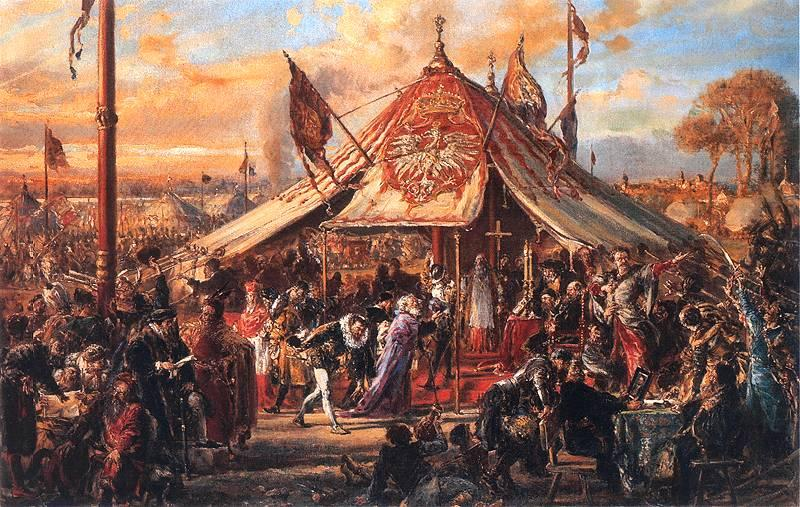
"The Commonwealth's Power at Its Zenith. Golden Liberty. The Election of 1573." Painting by Jan Matejko.

While some historians list the privilege of nihil novi as the culmination of the szlachta's empowerment process, others continue the list up to the end of the 16th century. Within this period, further privileges strengthening the nobles' position over the peasants came into effect when the sejm of 1520 in Bydgoszcz introduced laws that obliged peasants to provide labor to the nobles. It also gave the nobles unrestricted access to the Vistula river and reduced their vulnerability to city and towns' courts. The king, Zygmunt I of Poland, also promised to convene the Sejm every four years, and in either 1518 or 1521 (sources vary) the peasants lost the right to complain to the royal court.

In 1573 the Henrician Articles were introduced. A permanent contract between the "Polish nation" – in actuality, just the nobility of the Polish–Lithuanian Commonwealth – and a newly elected king upon his election to the throne, the Articles set out the fundamental principles of governance and constitutional law in the Polish–Lithuanian Commonwealth. The Articles, named after King Henryk Walezy (Henry III of France), confirmed numerous previous privileges and introduced new limitations on the monarch. Crucially, they confirmed that each new king would be elected by the nobles and that his children had no right of inheritance with regard to the throne. The king was also required to convene the Sejm every two years; had no right to declare war or peace without the approval of the Sejm; had to abide by the Warsaw Confederation's guarantees of religious freedom; and finally, agreed that if the monarch were to transgress against the law or the privileges of the szlachta, the Articles authorized the szlachta to refuse the king's orders and act against him. This later became known, in Polish practice, as the rokosz. In this regard, each king was required to swear that "if anything has been done by Us against laws, liberties, privileges or customs, we declare all the inhabitants of the Kingdom are freed from obedience to Us". In 1576, the right of ennoblement, except in wartime, was passed from the king to the sejm.

Anna Pasterak lists 1578, the year in which King Stefan Batory passed the right to deal with appeals into the hands of the nobility, creating the Crown Tribunal, as the date that marks the end of the process of the shaping of the nobles' privileges in Poland. Robert Bideleux and Ian Jeffries go even further, listing the year 1611 as the end, noting that it was first confirmed then that only nobles were permitted to buy landed estates.

== Significance and criticism ==
The empowerment of the szlachta and the incremental limitation of monarchic power in Poland can be seen as parallel to the guarantees made to the barons in Magna Carta, the precursor to the parliamentary ideals of Great Britain and, to a lesser extent, the United States, within which modern democracy has evolved. In contrast with the centralizing of power during the 15th century by the so-called "New Monarchs" of Western Europe, the empowerment of the szlachta can be interpreted as a centripetal movement, to localized aristocratic power and a weak central state, which "had become merely an institution stripped of all substance", as Fernand Braudel remarked. The dominance of the szlachta over other classes and the monarch was unprecedented in the contemporary Europe. At the same time it was paid for by the weakening of the other classes (peasantry and townsfolk), and the central (royal) power, which led to the weakening of the Polish state. The nobles' political monopoly on power resulted in stifling the development of the towns and cities and hurting the economy, which, coupled with their control over taxation, kept at a very low level, starved the government of income.

== See also ==
- Law of Privilege
- Liberum veto
- Lithuanian nobility
- Pacta conventa (Poland)
- Polish landed gentry
- Propination laws
- Sarmatism
