= Confederation (Poland–Lithuania) =

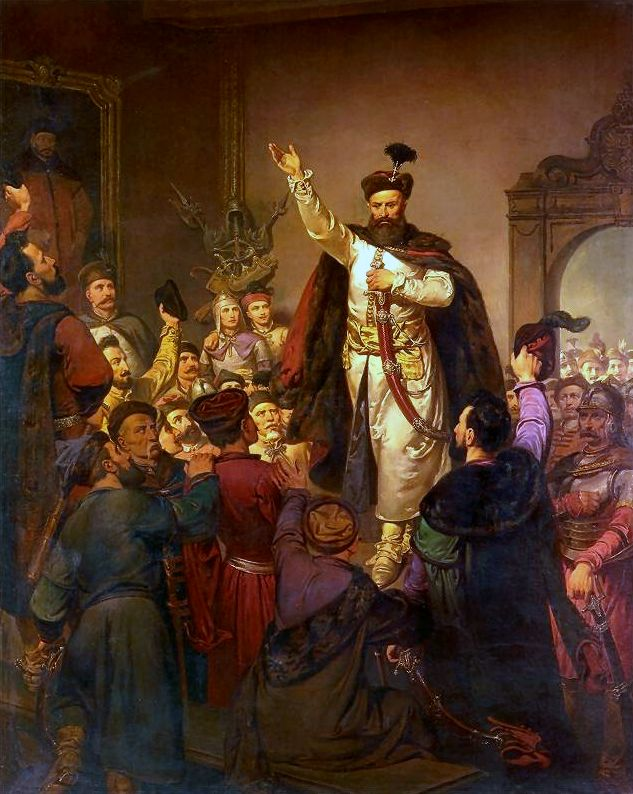
The swearing in of the Tyszowce Confederation in 1655, painting by Walery Eljasz-Radzikowski.

A konfederacja (Polish: [kɔ̃fɛdɛˈrat͡sja], confederation, confederacy) was an ad hoc association formed by the nobility (szlachta), clergy, and municipalities to pursue their stated aims or act in place of state authority, created in Poland and Lithuania between the 13th and 19th centuries. A konfederacja often took the form of an armed union aimed at redressing perceived abuses or trespasses by some authority, such as the royal authority. These "confederations" acted in place of state authority or to force their demands upon that authority.

They could be seen as a primary expression of direct democracy and the right of revolution in the Polish–Lithuanian Commonwealth, allowing nobles to act on their grievances and against the central authority. Its origins can be traced back to medieval resistance law (Latin: ius resistendi) against the ruler. A characteristic feature of the confederation was named membership: the list of its members was drawn up at the time of its formation. Since the formation occurred for the realisation of a predetermined goal, the confederation was temporary.

== History and function ==
In the late 13th century, confederations of municipalities began to appear, aiming to support public safety and provide security from rampant banditry. The first confederation was formed in 1298 by several municipalities, including Poznań, Pyzdry, Gniezno, and Kalisz in Greater Poland.

Confederations composed solely of knights emerged in Poland during the second half of the 14th century, with the first such confederation being established in 1352. They were convened to defend the nobles' liberties against central authority, the influence of the clergy, and the development of Hussitism. In 1307, in response to the formation of a confederation of nobles opposing the clergy's claims regarding tithes and jurisdiction, the clergy formed their own confederation.

In the years 1382 and 1384, inter-estate confederations (nobility and burghers) were convened in Radomsko to protect state security during the interregnum. During interregnums, confederations—essentially vigilance committees—were formed to replace the inactive royal court, protect internal order, and defend the state from external threats. The confederations, as a right of revolution, were recognized in Polish law through the Henrician articles (1573), part of the pacta conventa sworn by every Polish king since 1576. They stated (in the articulus de non praestanda oboedientia, a rule dating to 1501 from Privilege of Mielnik) that if the monarch did not recognize or abused the rights and privileges of the nobility (szlachta), the nobles would no longer be bound to obey him and would have the legal right to disobey him.

With the beginning of the 17th century, confederations became an increasingly significant element of the Commonwealth's political scene. In the 17th and 18th centuries, confederations were organized by magnates, and were either pro- or anti-royal. A confederation not recognized by the king was considered a rokosz ("rebellion"), although some of the rokosz would be eventually recognized by the king, who could even join them himself. Most pro-royal confederations were usually formed as a response to an anti-royal one, and some would take the form of an extraordinary session of the parliament (sejm), as happened in 1710, 1717, and 1735.

Confederations were usually formed in one part of the country and could expand into "general confederations" taking in most or all of the voivodeships of the Polish–Lithuanian Commonwealth. However, even such general confederations would be formed separately for the Crown of the Kingdom of Poland and the Grand Duchy of Lithuania.

Each confederation had a key document explaining its goals, known as the act of the confederation, which was deposited with the court (usually the local court for the region where the confederation was formed). Additional resolutions of the confederates, known as sanctia, would also be deposited with the court. Membership of the confederation was voluntary and required an oath. The executive branch of a confederation was headed by a marshal, and a group of advisers, each known as konsyliarz konfederacji. A marshal and associated konsyliarze were known as a generality (generalność). A confederation would also have a larger council, similar to a parliament (walna rada), which made decisions by majority vote. Until around the mid-18th century, resolutions of the council had to be unanimous, but afterward, majority voting became more common. The chief military commanders of confederations were known as regimentarze.

Also in the 18th century an institution known as a "confederated sejm" evolved. It was a parliament session (Sejm) that operated under the rules of a confederation. Its primary purpose was to avoid being subject to disruption by the liberum veto, unlike the national Sejm, which was paralyzed by the veto during this period. On some occasions, a confederated sejm was formed from the whole membership of the national Sejm, so that the liberum veto would not operate there.

Confederations were proscribed by law in 1717, but continued to operate, indicating a weakness of the Commonwealth's central authority. They were also abolished by the Constitution of May 3, 1791 (adopted by the Four-Year Sejm of 1788–1792, itself a confederated sejm). But in practice this prohibition was not observed. The May 3rd Constitution was overthrown in mid-1792, by the Targowica Confederation of Polish magnates backed by Russian Empire and eventually joined, under extreme duress, by King Stanisław II August. The ensuing Russian military intervention led (to the Confederates' surprise) to the Second Partition of Poland in 1793. In 1812 the General Confederation of the Kingdom of Poland was formed in Warsaw to Napoleon I's campaign against the Russian Empire.

== List of confederations ==
Some confederations from Polish history included:

- a confederation of municipalities in Greater Poland in 1298, aiming to provide public safety, recreated in 1302;
- a confederation of municipalities in Silesia in 1311, aiming to provide public safety;
- a confederation of municipalities from 1349–1350, aiming to provide public safety;
- Confederation of Maciej Borkowic in Greater Poland, opposing the disliked starost Wierzbięta of Paniewice (1352–1358);
- Confederation of Bartosz of Odolanowo, formed in Radom, aiming to provide security for the period of interregnum following the death of king Louis I (1382);
- a confederation in Radom, formed by magnates, nobility, and municipalities, in support of Queen Jadwiga;
- Piotrków Confederation, during a dispute about clergy's right to collect tithe (1406–1407);
- Wieluń Confederation, supporting the king against the Hussite invasion (1423–1424);
- Sieradz Confederation and Korczyn Confederation (1438);
- Confederation of Spytek of Melsztyn supporting the Hussites (1439);
- Prussian Confederation of Prussian municipalities, formed in Kwidzyn, against the Teutonic Order;
- Lwów Confederation was an alliance formed in the 17th century by the town and the nobility of Lwów (now Lviv, Ukraine) against unpopular officials;
- Chicken War (1537);
- Warsaw Confederation, formed in the Sejm (1573);
- Zebrzydowski Rebellion (1605);
- Tyszowce Confederation military and nobility against the Swedish invasion (1655);
- Lubomirski's Rokosz (1665–1666);
- Szczebrzesz Confederation against the election of Michał Korybut Wiśniowiecki (1672);
- Gołąb Confederation for the election of Michał Korybut Wiśnowiecki (1673);
- Starogard Confederation supporting Sweden (1703–1709);
- Greater Poland Confederation (Wielkopolska Confederation) (1703);
- Opatów Confederation and Warsaw Confederation, both formed against the Saxon king Augustus II of Poland (1704);
- Sandomierz Confederation formed in support of the Saxon king Augustus II of Poland (1704);
- Gorzyce Confederation and Tarnogród Confederation, both formed against the Saxon king Augustus II of Poland (1715);
- Grudziądz Confederation supporting Stanisław Leszczyński (1733–1734);
- Kolbuszowa Confederation supporting Stanisław Leszczyński (1734);
- Dzików Confederation supporting Stanisław Leszczyński (1734);
- Wilno Confederation formed by Czaroryski family against Karol Stanisław "Panie Kochanku" Radziwiłł (1764);
- Słuck Confederation formed by Greek Orthodox believers, demanding the restoration of rights (1767);
- Toruń Confederation (Thorn Confederation) formed by Protestant believers, demanding the restoration of rights (1767);
- Radom Confederation formed by the religious minorities (dissidents) in support of Karol Stanisław "Panie Kochanku" Radziwiłł (1767);
- Bar Confederation formed by opponents of king Stanisław August Poniatowski, Russian Empire and the religious minorities (1768–1772);
- Targowica Confederation formed by conservatives opposing the Constitution of 3 May (1792–1793);
- Grodno Confederation (1793); and
- General Confederation of the Kingdom of Poland, formed in Warsaw, in support of Napoleon I and against the Russian Empire (1812–1813).

== See also ==
- Sejmik
- Golden Liberty
- Thing
- Private defence agency
