= Chicken War =

Rebellion in Poland (1537)

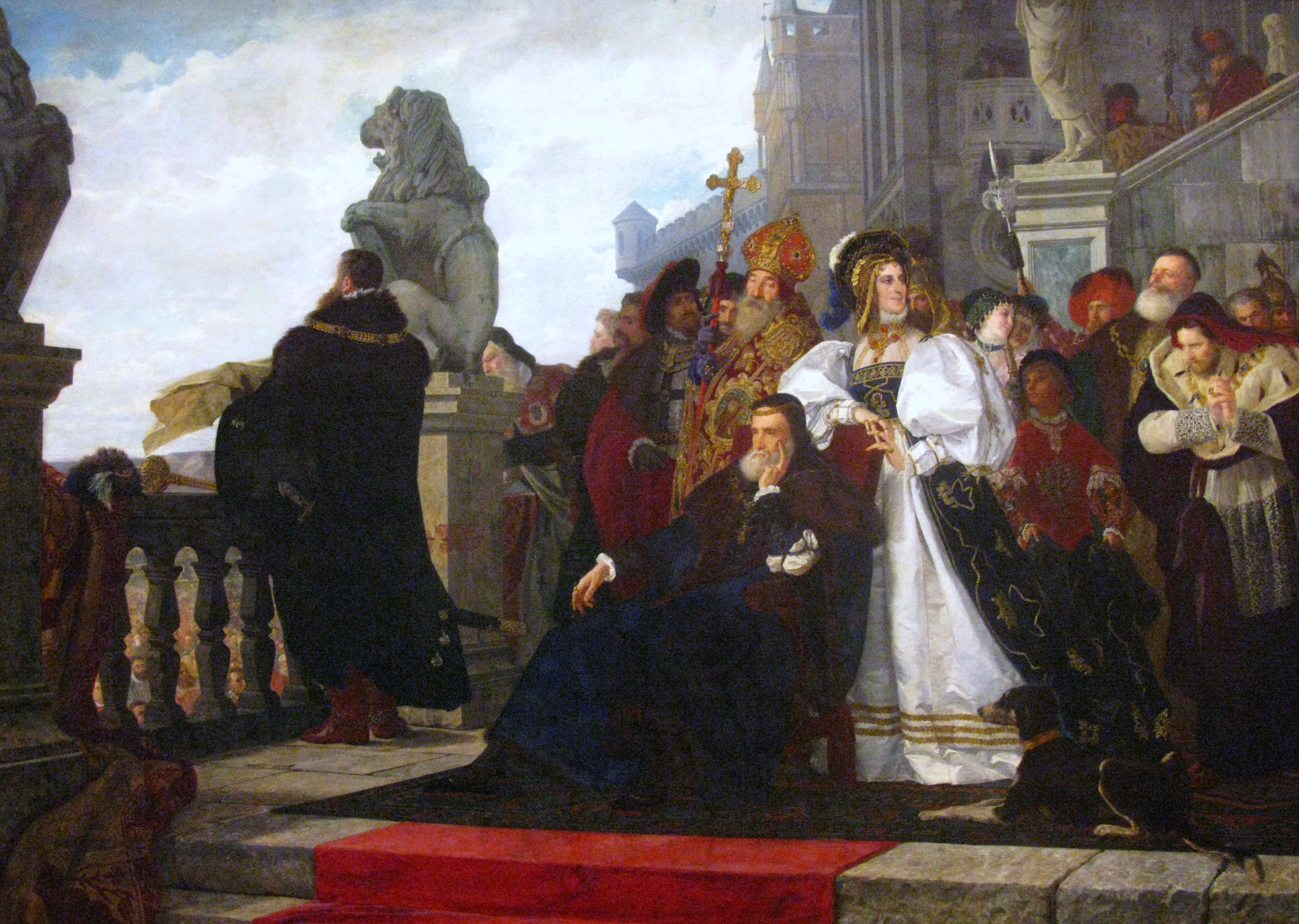
Chicken War by Henryk Rodakowski (1872)

Chicken War or Hen War (Polish: Wojna kokosza) is the colloquial name for a 1537 anti-royalist and anti-absolutist rokosz (rebellion) by the Polish nobility.

The derisive name was coined by the magnates, who for the most part supported the King and claimed that the conflict's only effect was the near-extinction of the local chickens, which were eaten by the nobles gathered for the rokosz at Lwów, in Ruthenian Voivodeship.

The magnates' choice of "kokosz"—meaning "an egg laying hen"—may have been inspired by a play on words between "kokosz" and the similar-sounding "rokosz".

The Chicken War was the first rokosz of the nobility in Polish history.

== Background ==
At the start of his reign, King Sigismund I the Old inherited the Kingdom of Poland with a century-long tradition of liberties of the nobility that was confirmed in numerous privileges. Sigismund faced the challenge of consolidating internal power to handle external threats to the country. During the rule of his predecessor, Alexander I, the statute of "Nihil novi" had been instituted, effectively forbidding kings of Poland to promulgate laws without the consent of the Parliament. That proved crippling to Sigismund's dealings with his nobles and a serious threat to the country's stability. To strengthen royal authority, he initiated a set of reforms, establishing a permanent conscription army in 1527 and extending the bureaucratic apparatus necessary to govern the state and finance the army. Supported by his Italian consort, Bona Sforza, he began buying up land and started several agricultural reforms to enlarge the royal treasury. He also initiated a process of restitution of royal properties, previously pawned or rented to the nobles.

== Rokosz ==
In 1537, however, the King's policies led to a major conflict. The nobility, who gathered near Lwów to meet with a levée en masse, called for a military campaign against Moldavia. However, the lesser and middle strata of the nobility called a rokosz, or semi-legal rebellion, to force the King to abandon his reforms. According to contemporary accounts, 150,000 militia had been assembled for the rebellion. The nobles presented him with 36 demands, most notably:

1. Confirmation and extension of the privileges of the nobility;
2. The carrying out of a law requiring the appointment of only local nobles to most important local offices;
3. Lifting the toll or exempting the nobility from it;
4. Exemption of the nobility from the tithes;
5. A cleanup of the treasury, rather than its expansion;
6. A cessation of further land acquisitions by Queen Bona Sforza;
7. The creation of a body of permanent advisors to the king - and
8. Adoption of a law concerning incompatibilitas—the incompatibility of certain offices that were not to be joined in the same hand (for instance, that of a Starosta and of a Palatine or Castellan);

Finally, the angry protesters criticized Queen Bona, whom they accused of "bad upbringing" of young Prince Sigismund Augustus (future King Sigismund II) and of seeking to increase her power in the state, even if both involvements were generally positive. It soon transpired, however, that the nobility's leaders were divided and that achieving a compromise was almost impossible. Too weak to start a civil war against the King, the protesters finally agreed to what was thought a compromise.

The King rejected most of their demands but accepted the principle of incompatibilitas the next year and agreed not to force the election of the future king vivente rege – in the lifetime of the reigning king. Thereupon the nobility returned to their homes, having achieved little.

== See also ==
- Lubomirski's Rokosz
- Rokosz
- Zebrzydowski's Rokosz
