= Privilege of Mielnik =

1501 Polish constitutional act

The Privilege of Mielnik (Polish: Przywilej mielnicki) was an act promulgated on October 25, 1501, at Mielnik by Poland's King Alexander Jagiellon. It substantially expanded the powers of the Senate and the magnates, at the expense of the king. Furthermore, it de facto introduced a republican form of government. However, the privilege was not confirmed by the king after his election, and in 1504 was rejected by the Sejm (see Łaski's Statutes).

== Background ==
After the death of Casimir IV Jagiellon (1492), the personal union between the Kingdom of Poland and the Grand Duchy of Lithuania was broken. The new king of Poland was John I Albert, while Lithuania was governed by his brother, Alexander. Following his father, Olbracht tried to win the support of the nobility, granting it several concessions in the Statutes of Piotrków. The failed invasion of Moldavia in 1497 complicated Poland's internal situation, and strengthened the position of the magnates. At the same time, Lithuania was attacked by Ivan III of Russia, and in 1499 both nations signed the Union of Kraków and Vilnius, which revived the Polish–Lithuanian alliance. In 1500 John Albert died, and on October 3, 1501, Alexander became the King of Poland. His election worsened the Lithuanians' position, and they agreed to the Union of Mielnik. Alexander himself had to sign the Privilege of Mielnik, which limited his authority and expanded the powers of the Senate.

== Description ==
The Privilege was as follows:

- the Senate became major governing body of Poland, and in case of dissent, the decision of the highest senators was binding,
- the king was to be head of the senate, and his weak position was emphasized by his new title, "princeps senatus", which referred to the Roman tradition,
- the king lost the right to name senators by himself. New senators were to be named only with the permission of the Senate,
- starostas, who had previously been royal representatives, were subjected to the Senate,
- senators were to answer only to the Senate,
- senators were allowed to renounce allegiance to the king in some situations.

The new political system of Poland, created by the privilege, was disliked by the nobility, which refused to pay taxes and to take part in the pospolite ruszenie. Starostas did not cooperate with senators, and during the 1504 Sejm, which took place in Piotrków Trybunalski, Jan Łaski initiated attack on the powerful Lesser Poland magnates. As a result, the nobility managed to regain their position, and during the 1505 Sejm in Radom, the Nihil novi act was introduced, which voided the Privilege of Mielnik.

== See also ==
- Rokosz
- Szlachta's privileges

== Sources ==
- Zdzisław Kaczmarczyk, Bogusław Leśnodorski, Historia państwa i prawa Polski od połowy XV w. do r. 1795, PWN, Warszawa 1957
- Grzegorz Błaszczyk, Litwa na przełomie średniowiecza i nowożytności, Poznań 2002 ISBN 83 7177 075 8
