= Serfdom in Poland =

Historical system of labour in Poland from the Middle Ages to the 19th century

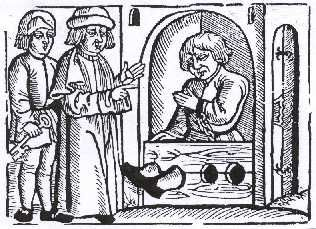
A peasant in stocks in a 16th-century Polish woodcut

Serfdom in Poland was a legal and economic system that bound the peasant population to hereditary plots of land owned by the szlachta, or Polish nobility. Emerging from the 12th century, this system became firmly established by the 16th century, significantly shaping the social, economic, and political landscape of the Polish–Lithuanian Commonwealth.

Under this system, peasants were obligated to provide extensive labor services (corvée), while their personal freedoms were severely restricted. The nobility's rights expanded over time through legal acts such as the Statutes of Piotrków in 1496, which limited peasants' mobility, and the Constitution Nihil novi in 1505, which enhanced noble privileges. These developments entrenched serfdom and created a rigid social hierarchy.

Serfdom became central to the economy of the Polish–Lithuanian Commonwealth, underpinning its status as one of Europe's leading agricultural producers. The Commonwealth relied heavily on the export of grain and other agricultural commodities to Western Europe. Through dependence on serf labor, the nobility accumulated wealth and sustained political influence, thereby reinforcing a rigid social order where the szlachta held significant power over the disenfranchised peasant class.

Attempts to reform or abolish serfdom emerged during the late 18th and 19th centuries amid both internal and European political upheaval. The Constitution of 3 May 1791 aimed to improve conditions for peasants by placing them under state protection, yet it did not abolish serfdom. The Połaniec Manifesto of 1794, issued during the Kościuszko Uprising, granted peasants limited rights, such as personal freedom and reduced labor obligations. Despite these efforts, the reforms were short-lived due to the uprising's failure.

Serfdom in Polish territories was ultimately abolished in the 19th century under foreign rule following the Partitions of Poland. In Prussian-controlled areas, serfdom was abolished through the Stein–Hardenberg reforms between 1807 and 1816. In Austrian Galicia, it was abolished in 1848 amid the Revolutions of 1848. In the Russian-controlled Congress Poland, serfdom was finally abolished in 1864 following the January Uprising. The abolition of serfdom led to significant social and economic transformations, facilitating modernization and contributing to the eventual restoration of Polish independence in 1918.

== 10th to 14th centuries ==
In the early days of the Kingdom of Poland under the Piast Dynasty in the 10th and 11th centuries, the social class of peasantry was among the several classes that developed. The peasants had the right to migrate, to own land, and were entitled to certain forms of judicial recourse in exchange for specific obligations toward their feudal lords.

Over time, more peasants became dependent on feudal lords. This occurred in various ways; the granting of lands together with their inhabitants to a lord by the king, debt bondage, and peasants subjecting themselves to a local lord in exchange for protection. There were several groups of peasants who had varying levels of rights, and their status changed over time, gradually degrading from a yeoman-like status to full serfdom. Conversely, the least privileged class of the bondsmen, the niewolni or outright slaves (formed primarily from prisoners-of-war), gradually disappeared over the same period. By the late 12th century, peasantry could be divided into the free peasants (wolni or liberi), with the right to leave and relocate, and bonded subjects (poddani or obnoxii), without the right to leave. All peasants who held land from a feudal lord had to perform services or deliver goods to their lord. In time, and with the development of currency, most of those services evolved into payment of monetary rent, which became the dominant form of service around the 14th and 15th centuries.

== 15th to 18th centuries ==
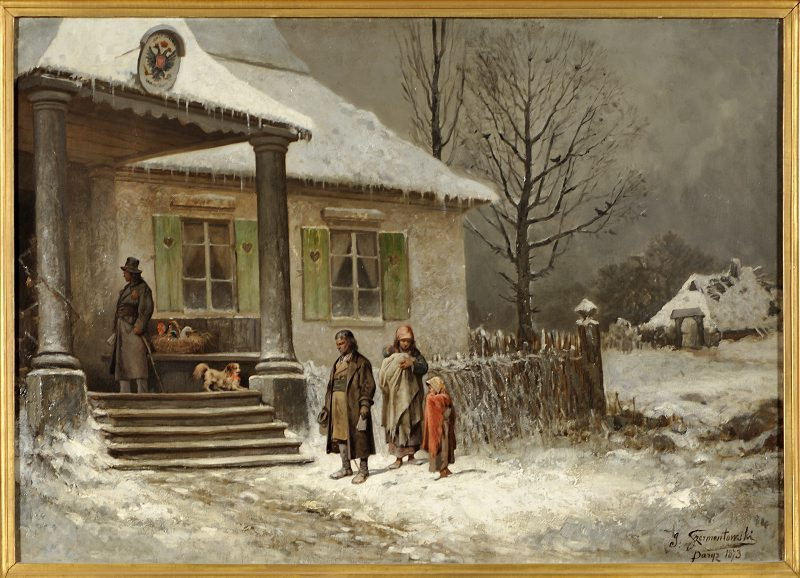
Serfdom, painting by Józef Szermentowski (1873), National Museum in Warsaw

Around the 14th and 15th centuries, the right to leave the land became increasingly restricted, and peasants became tied to the land. Proper serfdom evolved in Poland together with the development of noble manorial estates known as folwarks, and with the export-driven grain trade (so-called Polish or Baltic grain trade) economy. According to historian Edward Corwin, the promulgation of the Statutes of Piotrków in 1496 marks the proper beginning of the serfdom era in Poland. Likewise, Paul Robert Magocsi points to a series of related legislation around the turn of the 15th and 16th centuries.

It was tied with the decrease in monetary rent, replaced by physical labor, demands for which increased over time. Whereas in the early days of serfdom in Poland, the peasant might have been required to farm less than three weeks in a year for his lord, in the 16th century, a weekly service of 1–2 man-days become common, and in the 18th century, almost all of a peasant's time could have been requested by the lord, in extreme cases requiring a peasant to labor eight man-days a week per 1 łan of land farmed by a peasants family for their own needs (the land belonged to the landlord), which in practice meant that the male head of the family worked full-time for the lord, leaving his wife and children working on the peasant's family land, and even then they had to help him occasionally, unless a peasant hired additional workers (poorer peasants). Simultaneously, peasantry rights (to own land, to leave it, or to have independent, royal justice) were reduced. 1521 marked the end of the peasant right to complain to the royal court.

By the mid-16th century, no peasant could leave the land without explicit permission of the lord. The situation of individuals who did not own land also worsened (migrant peasant workers), as several laws attempted to force them to become peasants (serfs). They were also forced to partake in various monopolies of their local lords (such as to buy drinks only in the tavern owned by the lord, or use only the lord's owned mills). Due to increased population, and impact of certain laws, individual peasant estates became steadily smaller. This resulted, particularly from the second half of the 16th century, in increased impoverishment of the peasantry, the rise of banditry, and the occasional peasant uprising. This phenomenon was also witnessed in several other Central and Eastern European countries, and was known as the "second serfdom" or "neo-serfdom".

Reversal of those trends began in the 18th century, as part of various reforms aiming to revitalize the ailing governance and economy of the Polish–Lithuanian Commonwealth. Some serfs became emancipated by their owners, who replaced the physical labor with monetary rent payments. It became illegal for a lord to murder a serf, and the peasants regained some right to land ownership.

As the situation of Polish serfs improved, it actually caused a problem in the Polish–Russian relations. Russian peasants were escaping from the Russian Empire to the Polish–Lithuanian Commonwealth in significant enough numbers to become a major concern for the Tsardom of Russia. Increasingly in the 18th century, Russian armies raided territories of the Commonwealth, officially to recover the escapees, but in fact kidnapping many locals. Describing the system as it existed by the end of the century, Wagner writes: "The situation of the peasants in Poland was better than in most other countries. In France and Germany, for example, the owners of landed estates had unlimited jurisdiction over them, including the power to punish by death. In Russia, their economic oppression was notorious, and one of the reasons Catherine II gave for the partition of Poland was the fact that thousands of peasants escaped from Russia to Poland to seek a better fate." Piotr Kimla noted that the Russian government spread international propaganda, mainly in France, which falsely exaggerated serfdom conditions in Poland, while ignoring worse conditions in Russia, as one of the justification for the partitions. This point of view does not agree with the opinion of the majority of Western European contemporary and old scholars that the actual financial situation of "the overwhelming majority of subjects of the Russian Empress" is better than in most European countries. Despite the apparent improvement in the legal status of the peasants in Poland, they were still in a precarious situation, which caused the Russian authorities to try to alleviate their situation with various benefits.

Polish government reforms aiming at improving the situation of the peasantry reached culmination with the Constitution of 3 May 1791, which declared that the government would protect the peasantry, and encourage the use of contracts between peasants and their lords. Any further reforms were made impossible by the partitions of Poland and the resulting disappearance of the Polish state.

== Abolition of serfdom in Poland ==
The abolition of serfdom in Poland was a protracted process that unfolded over the 18th and 19th centuries. Despite early attempts at reform, significant change was often impeded by the szlachta, who were largely reluctant to relinquish their traditional privileges and viewed peasants as subordinate.

=== Early Attempts at Reform ===
Enlightenment ideas began to influence Polish intellectuals and some progressive members of the nobility in the late 18th century. This led to calls for social and economic reforms from the likes of Stanisław Staszic and Hugo Kołłątaj. Following the Second Partition of Poland, the Constitution of 3 May 1791 was a significant legislative effort aimed at strengthening the Polish–Lithuanian Commonwealth. It took the peasants under the protection of the state, marking a first limited step towards improving their condition after nearly three centuries of dominance by the landowners. The constitution did not abolish serfdom, and its vague commitment to protection did little to challenge the existing power of the nobility. Opposition from powerful nobles, who feared that any reforms would undermine their interests, limited the scope of these early reform efforts.

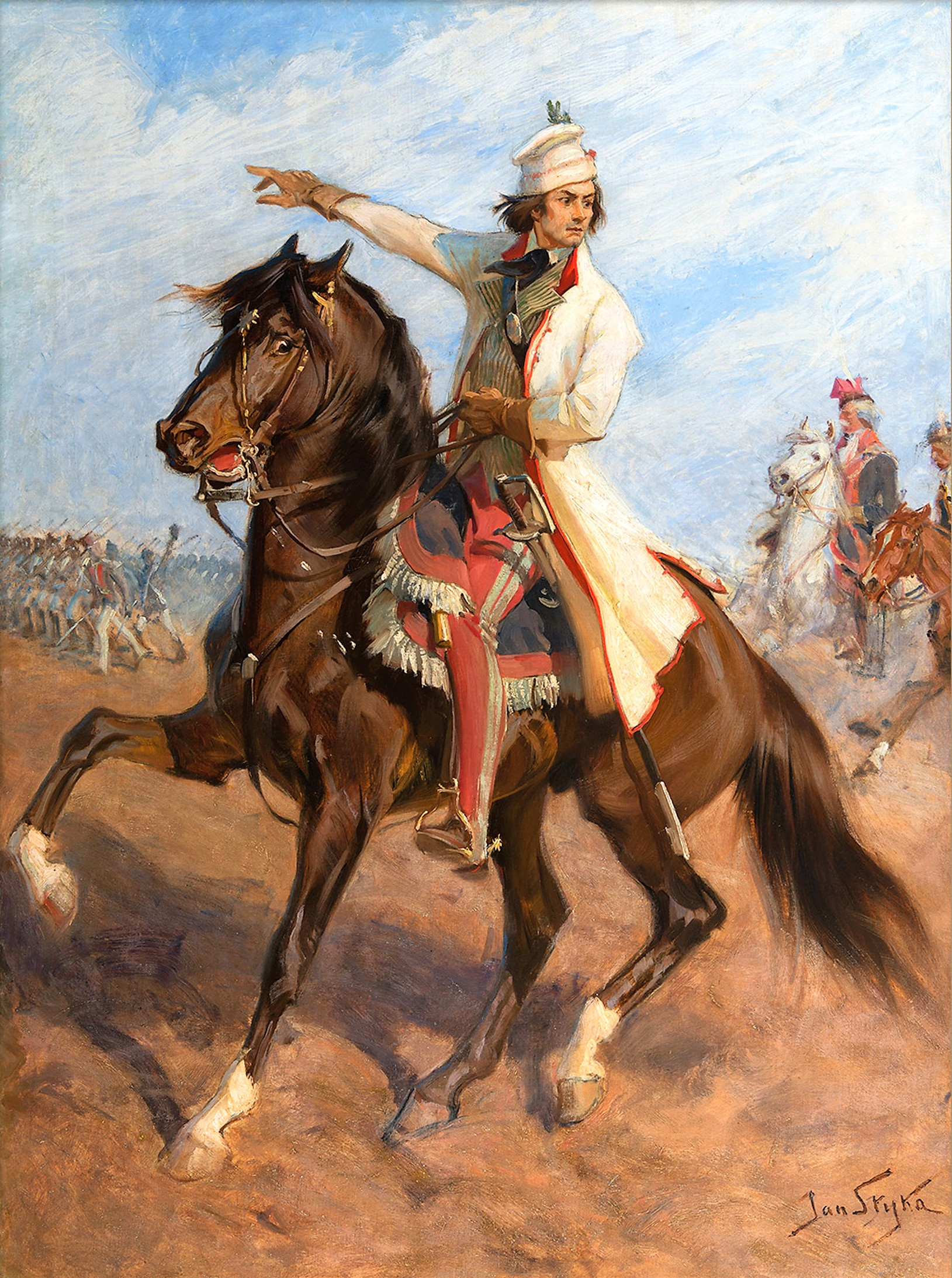
Portrait of Kościuszko wearing peasant russet coat.

In 1794, during the Kościuszko Uprising, General Tadeusz Kościuszko issued the Połaniec Manifesto in an effort to mobilize peasant support against foreign partitioning powers. The manifesto offered limited freedoms, reducing obligations of serfdom and granting personal liberties, albeit conditional. This partial emancipation was a compromise intended to balance the interests of the nobility and the need for peasant support. Many peasant recruits, armed with scythes and pikes due to a lack of firearms, fought alongside the regular army, demonstrating resilience in defensive efforts. Kościuszko's appeal, while bolstering the insurgent ranks, did not secure the victory he hoped for.

The manifesto's cautious reforms, though revolutionary in spirit, fell short of inspiring mass peasant participation and were viewed as a tempered concession rather than a full commitment to abolition. Radical voices, such as those among the Polish Jacobins, argued for more comprehensive measures, including proposals for peasant land ownership and even limited representation, reflecting the influence of the French Revolution. Despite these bold ideas, no significant structural change to serfdom was achieved, and with the eventual defeat of the uprising, the manifesto's reforms were reversed. Nevertheless, Kościuszko's appeal to the peasants established a lasting legacy that would inspire future social movements and agrarian reform efforts.

In the 19th century, various reforms took place at different paces in the Austrian partition, Prussian partition, and the Russian partition with the advent of industrialization. Serfdom was abolished in Prussia in 1807, in Austria in 1848, in Russia in 1861, and in the Congress Kingdom of Poland in 1864.

== See also ==
- Agriculture in Poland
- Domar serfdom model
- Indentured servitude
- Proclamation of Połaniec
- Slavery in Lithuania
