= Union of Mielnik =

1501 attempt to unite Poland and Lithuania

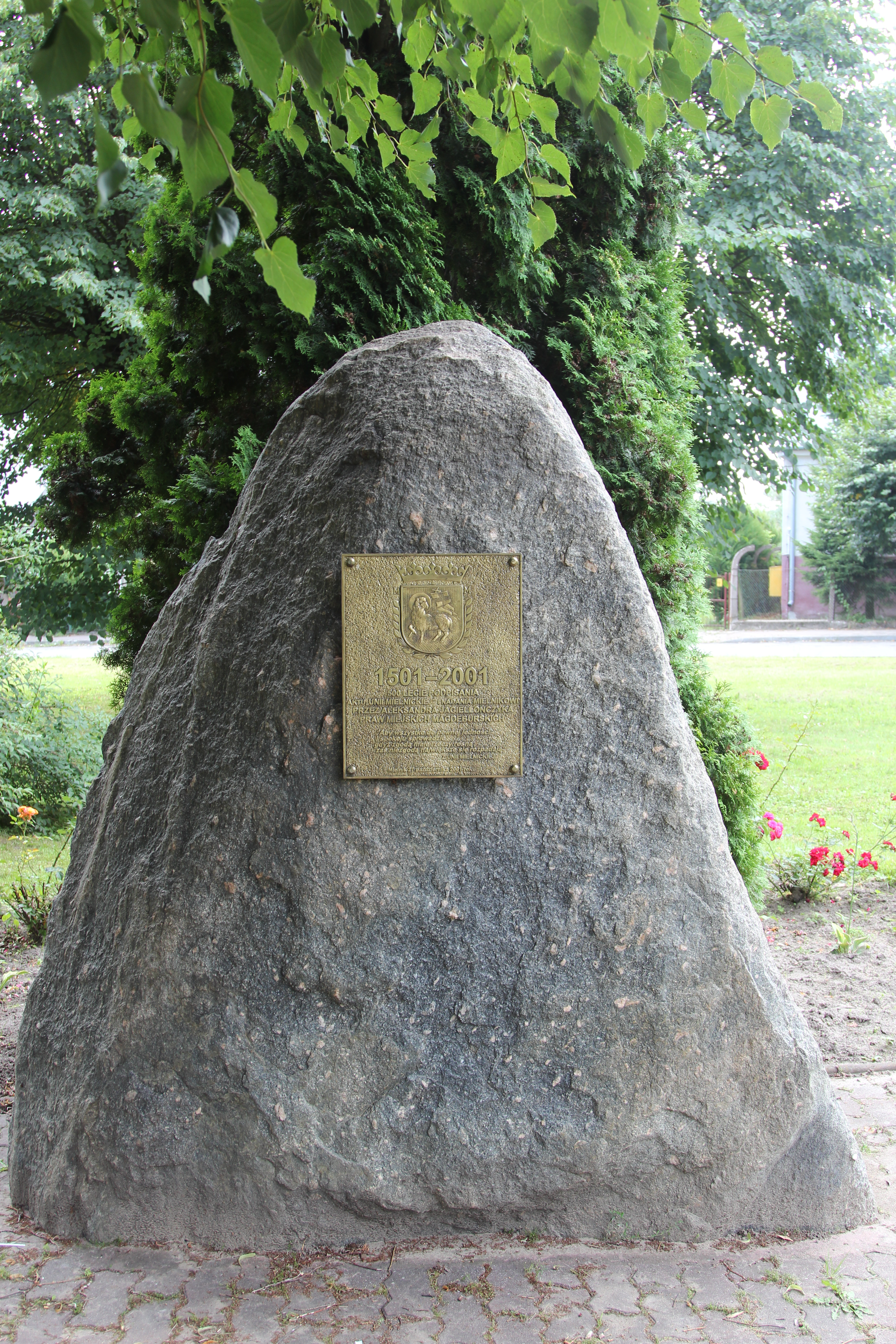
Union of Mielnik memorial in Mielnik

The Act of Mielnik or Union of Mielnik was an attempt to unite the Kingdom of Poland with the Grand Duchy of Lithuania in 1501. It was not ratified by the Lithuanian Seimas or by the Polish Sejm (see Łaski's Statute). The Act of Mielnik remained just a political project. Despite the failure to unify two countries into a single state, Poland and Lithuania were under a personal union until the Union of Lublin of 1569.

== Provisions ==
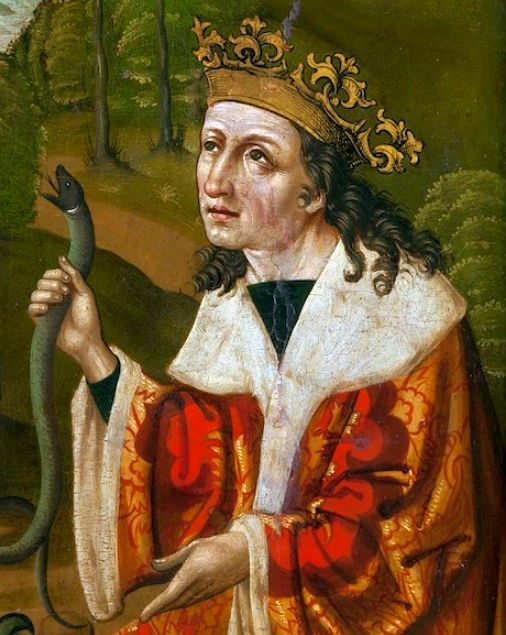
Alexander Jagiellon

After death of John I Albert, King of Poland, his brother Alexander Jagiellon, Grand Duke of Lithuania, became the most suitable candidate for the new king. Such a move would revive the Polish–Lithuanian union, a personal union between the two states. However, Alexander's ambitions went further. The Act of Mielnik was drafted by Polish and Lithuanian diplomats on 3 October 1501 in Piotrków and confirmed on 23 October 1501 by Alexander (who was already elected as the Polish King but not yet crowned) and few members of the Lithuanian Council of Lords. On 30 October, twenty-seven Lithuanian nobles and boyars agreed to abide by the Union of Melnik. The act declared that Poland and Lithuania would be united into a single state with one ruler, one parliament (Great Sejm), one monetary system, and one army. The separate and independent position of the Grand Duke of Lithuania was eliminated, transferring the title to King of Poland. It meant that Alexander gave up his hereditary rights to the throne of the Grand Duchy. Such declaration sharply contrasted with the Union of Kraków and Vilna of 1499, which envisioned the Polish–Lithuanian union as an alliance of two equal partners.

== Jagiellon ambitions ==
Such a declaration reflected changed priorities of the Jagiellon dynasty. In Lithuania, their patrimony, the Jagiellons had hereditary rights, while in Poland they had to be elected by the nobles. Earlier Jagiellons saw Lithuania as their stronghold to ensure their power in Poland and therefore supported Lithuania's independence from Poland. However, as the Kings were educated and lived mostly in Poland, they began to focus on Polish affairs often regarding Lithuanian matters as secondary. As Jagiellons became monarchs of the Kingdom of Hungary and the Kingdom of Bohemia, they became interested in uniting the two countries into one, strengthening their positions for further dynastic expansion in Eastern and Central Europe. However, the Act of Melnik was not supported by Alexander's brother Vladislas II, King of Bohemia and Hungary.

== Ratification ==
The Act attracted only limited support among the Lithuanian nobles, chiefly Voivode of Trakai Jan Jurjewicz Zabrzeziński and Bishop of Vilnius Wojciech Tabor. Some Lithuanians hoped for Polish assistance in the Muscovite–Lithuanian Wars, especially after the defeat in the Battle of Vedrosha. Most nobles, including Grand Chancellor Mikołaj Radziwiłł, Bishop of Samogitia Martynas Lintfaras, regent of Navahrudak Albrecht Goštautas, were against the Act. The Act required that it would be ratified by the Lithuanian Seimas. However, the war with the Grand Duchy of Moscow postponed the Seimas until 1505 and by that time Alexander himself showed much less interest in ratifying the Act. It was hoped that the Act of Melnik could be ratified by the Polish Sejm in Radom in 1505. However, the Lithuanian Seimas in Brest rejected the Act and did not authorize the Lithuanian delegates to the Sejm in Radom to discuss the Act.

== See also ==
- Privilege of Mielnik
