= Voivodes of the Polish–Lithuanian Commonwealth =

Officials in charge of Polish-Lithuanian Commonwealth provinces

Voivodes of the Polish–Lithuanian Commonwealth were one of the highest ranking officials who could sit in the Senate of Poland. They were the officials in charge of the voivodeships (provinces/palatinates) of the Polish–Lithuanian Commonwealth. The office first appears as Palatine (Palatinus) who held the foremost position after the King. As Poland broke up into separate principalities, each Prince had his court and his own Palatine. When the Kingdom was (in part) consolidated, the Palatines became heads of those former Principalities, which then became Palatinates. As such, the Palatines were members of the King's Council (comites palatini). The title merged with the Polish Voivode or Wojewoda (Slavic Woi-woda/вои-вода (Cyrillic), with two functions, in army or war, and as a “guide” or director, a lexical and institutional equivalent of the Latin Dux Exercituum and Duke, known by the German Herzog, each meaning "leader of the army"). The difference between Voivode and Duke is that whereas the Duke began as a rank by appointment of the Monarch and later became a hereditary title of honour, the Voivode was appointed for life and maintained real authority as an official—before the Voivodes, too, lost significance to the Starostas. Polish historians, however, use Palatine (Palatyn) and Voivode (Wojewoda) synonymously.

== Powers ==
The powers of voivodes varied, as determined by historical precedent specific to each voivodeship. The least powerful of whom were in Halych Ruthenia (Ruś Halicka), and the most powerful of whom were vassals answerable to the king alone, in Royal Prussia (Prusy Królewskie). Those powers changed over time as well.

The office of the voivode was created in the Kingdom of Poland under Piasts, and spread from the Crown of the Polish Kingdom to the Grand Duchy of Lithuania after 1569 where the officeholder became an overseer of his voivodeship, over its administration; however, the effectiveness and real authority of this office declined, so that in the Kingdom of Poland under Jagiellons it was much reduced in significance.

In the field of the military, the voivodeship retained only the role of the leader of a pospolite ruszenie. Administrative powers were limited to the role of Marshal of the Sejmik, but even that had disappeared by the time of the Commonwealth. The voivode's control over the cities was mostly honorific, as formally that function was the power of the starost. One of the few powers that voivodes retained throughout history was the power to set and enforce prices (although in fact this duty was delegated to the sub-voivode (podwojewoda)).

Voivodes of Cracow, Poznań, Vilnius, Trakai, Sandomierz, and Kalisz (as well as the Castellan of Cracow) held the keys to the Crown Treasury (skarbiec koronny) on Wawel.

Voivodes were appointed by the king until 1775, when the power to appoint them devolved to the Permanent Council (Rada Nieustająca). The exceptions to this rule were the voivodes of Połock and Vilnius, who were elected by the szlachta (nobility) from their respective lands (although they still had to be approved by the King). Like all officials in the Commonwealth, only members of the szlachta were eligible to hold an official post.

After 1565, the principle of incompatibilitas ("incompatibility") precluded voivodes and castellans from holding a second title as a minister—except for the post of hetman—as well as the other voivode of starosta grodowy in his own voivodeship.

In the Commonwealth, where the nobility forbade the use of foreign honorary hereditary titles, lifetime titles connected with offices were still considered legal to use. Also the wives and children of a dignitary enjoyed their own forms of his title. Therefore, even though the powers of the voivode were relatively small, it was a prestigious position much coveted by the nobles. Thus, the palatinal families (rodziny wojewodzinskie) are one of the highest rank among today's Polish aristocracy, next in rank below hereditary Princes.

Although many individual voivodes had significant power in the Commonwealth, it was not by virtue of their title, but owing to their wealth and influence, which eventually secured them the prestigious title of the voivode. Thus, it is not the title that earned the title.

== List ==
Even when a voivodeship ceased to exist after borders shifted, the office remained intact and the voivode preserved his privileges, such as the right to sit and vote in the Senate. Thus the number of voivodes increased in time, from 32 after the creation of the Commonwealth in 1569 to 37 by the time of its end in 1795.

This is a list of the voivodes’ precedence sitting in the Senate of Poland. They took their seats after the bishops, as the first secular officials, although in practice their power was less than that of Ministers of the Polish–Lithuanian Commonwealth (who however sat last in the Senate).

Note that among them sat three distinguished castellans (wyróznieni kasztelanowie): Castellan of Kraków (who took precedence over all voivodes), Castellan of Vilnius (who sat after the Voivode of Sandomierz) and Castellan of Trakai (who sat after the Voivode of Sieradz). There was also one starost (Elder of Samogitia) who sat after the Voivode of Łęczyca.

For a chronological list of specific office holders, see the articles below.

In 1569, after Union of Lublin:

1. Voivode of Kraków (wojewoda krakowski). Seat: Kraków.
2. Voivode of Poznań (wojewoda poznański). Seat: Poznań.
3. Voivode of Vilnius (wojewoda wileński). Seat: Vilnius.
4. Voivode of Sandomierz (wojewoda sandomierski). Seat: Sandomierz.
5. Voivode of Kalisz (wojewoda kaliski). Seat: Kalisz.
6. Voivode of Trakai (wojewoda trocki). Seat: Trakai.
7. Voivode of Sieradz (wojewoda sieradzki). Seat: Sieradz.
8. Voivode of Łęczyca (wojewoda łęczycki). Seat: Łęczyca.
9. Voivode of Brześć Kujawski (wojewoda brzeski kujawawski). Seat: Brześć Kujawski.
10. Voivode of Kijów (wojewoda kijowski). Seat: Kijów (Kyiv).
11. Voivode of Inowrocław (wojewoda inowrocławski). Seat: Inowrocław.
12. Voivode of Ruś (Ruthenia) (wojewoda ruski). Seat: Lwów (Lviv).
13. Voivode of Wołyń (wojewoda wołyński). Seat: Łuck.
14. Voivode of Podole (wojewoda podolski). Seat: Kamieniec Podolski.
15. Voivode of Smoleńsk (wojewoda smoleński). Seat: Smoleńsk. Notes: province lost in the 1650s, titular office only afterwards.
16. Voivode of Lublin (wojewoda lubelski). Seat: Lublin.
17. Voivode of Połock (wojewoda połocki). Seat: Połock.
18. Voivode of Bełsk (Bełz) (wojewoda bełski). Seat: Bełsk (Bełz).
19. Voivode of Nowogródek (wojewoda nowogrodzki). Seat: Nowogródek.
20. Voivode of Płock (wojewoda płocki). Seat: Płock.
21. Voivode of Witebsk (wojewoda witebski). Seat: Witebsk.
22. Voivode of Masovia (wojewoda mazowiecki). Seat: Warsaw (Warszawa).
23. Voivode of Podlaskie (wojewoda podlaski). Seat: Drohiczyn.
24. Voivode of Rawa (wojewoda rawski). Seat: Rawa Mazowiecka.
25. Voivode of Brześć Litewski (wojewoda brzeski litewski). Seat: Brześć Litewski.
26. Voivode of Chełmno (wojewoda chełminski). Seat: Chełmno.
27. Voivode of Mścisław (wojewoda mścisławski). Seat: Mścisław.
28. Voivode of Malbork (wojewoda malborski). Seat: Malbork.
29. Voivode of Bracław (wojewoda bracławski). Seat: Bracław.
30. Voivode of Pomerania (wojewoda pomorski). Seat: Skarszewy.
31. Voivode of Mińsk (wojewoda miński). Seat: Mińsk.
32. Voivode of Inflanty (Livonia) (wojewoda inflandzki). Seat: Dyneburg.

Created around 1598 and lost in the 1620s:

1. Voivode of Wenden (wojewoda wendenski). Seat: Wenden (Cēsis).
2. Voivode of Parnawa (wojewoda parnawski). Seat: Parnawa.
3. Voivode of Dorpat (wojewoda dorpacki or wojewoda derpski). Seat: Dorpat.

Created in 1635:
- Voivode of Czernihów (wojewoda czernihowski). Seat: Czernihów.

Created in 1768:
- Voivode of Gniezno (wojewoda gnieźnieński). Seat: Gniezno.

== See also ==
- Subdivisions of the Polish–Lithuanian Commonwealth
