= Łaski's Statute =

Codification of law published in the Kingdom of Poland

Coordinates: 50.0600°N 19.9239°E

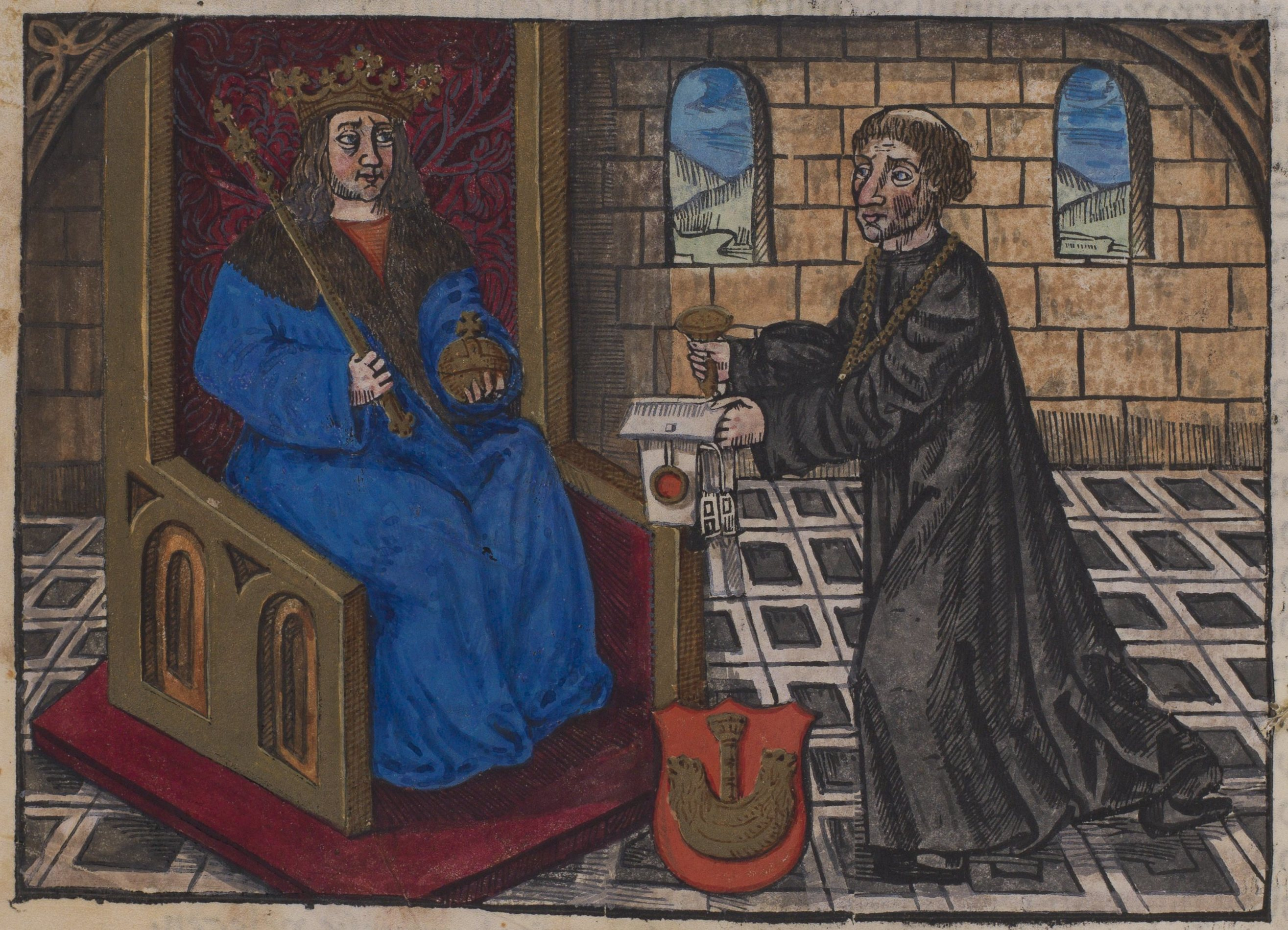
Jan Łaski presents the Statutes, adopted by the Sejm, to King Alexander Jagiellon.

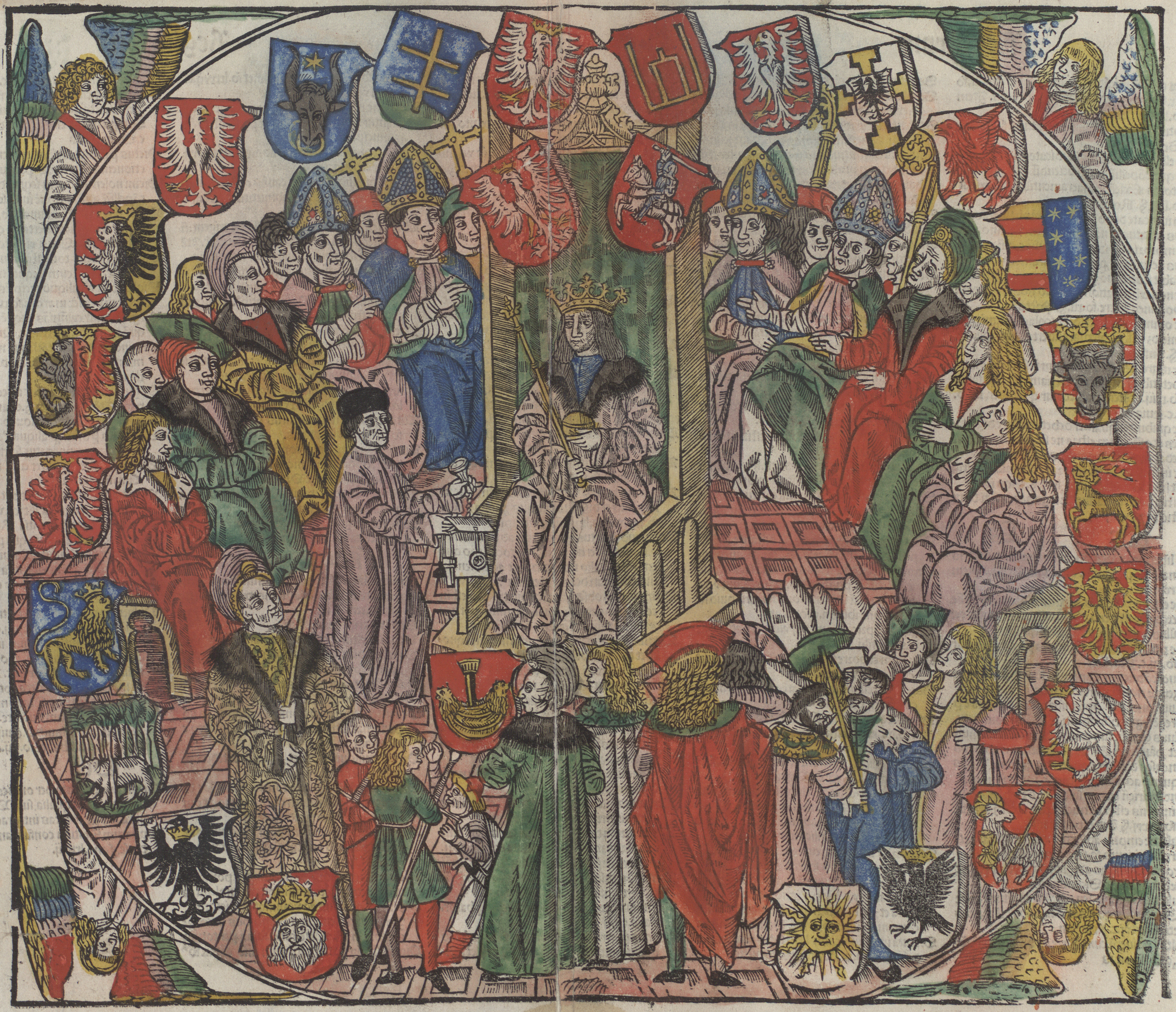

Łaski's Statute(s) (Polish: Statut(y) Łaskiego, Latin: Commune Incliti Poloniae regni privilegium constitutionum et indultuum publicitus decretorum approbatorumque), of 1505, was the first codification of law published in the Kingdom of Poland. The printing in 1506 was the first illustrated printing in Poland.

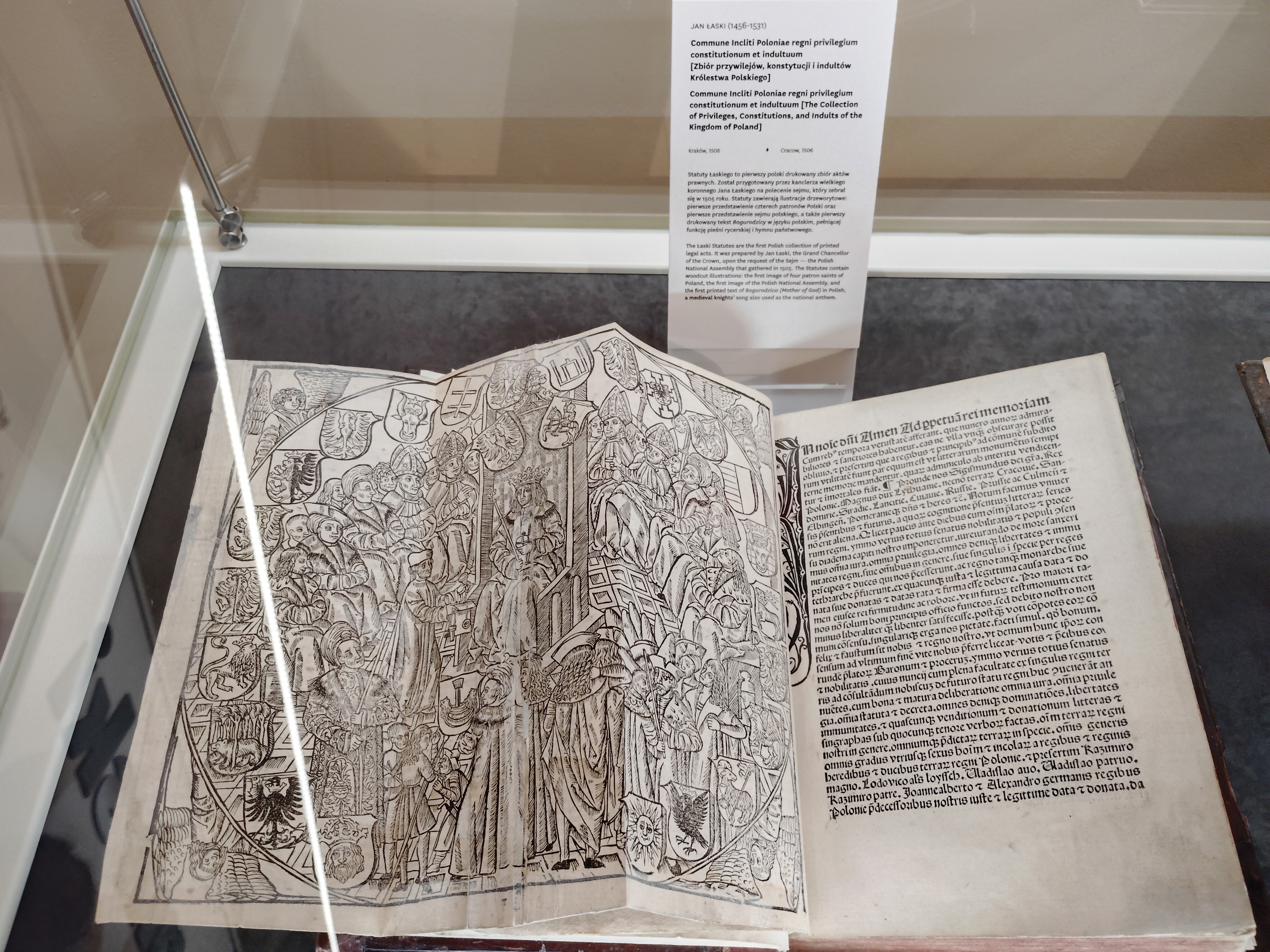
Ossolineum Museum, May 2026

== History ==
Łaski's Statutes were drawn up by Chancellor and Primate Jan Łaski (hence they are named for him) and consolidated nearly all the legislation that had earlier appeared in Poland. Łaski had been asked to codify existing Polish law by the Sejm (parliament), meeting in 1505 at Radom.

The Statutes, in 720 folio pages, comprised two parts. The first, confirmed by King Alexander Jagiellon and thus carrying the force of law, collected all manner of legislation—privileges, statutes and edicts promulgated by the king or adopted by the Sejm, as well as treaties, such as peace treaties that had been entered into with the Teutonic Order. The second part discussed the legal system, primarily Magdeburg law, and included text from the Sachsenspiegel, Weichbild and Lübeck law.

The Statutes showed a certain bias in promoting Łaski's political views: they supported the execution movement, which sought to strengthen the power of the lesser nobility and the king, while weakening the aristocratic magnates, and so omitted some documents that favored the magnates. Notably, Łaski's Statutes omitted the 1501 Privilege of Mielnik and Union of Mielnik. The Mielnik laws represented a conflict between the king and magnates: both had made promises prior to the King's election, and both refused to confirm them afterward.

Printed the following year (1506) by Jan Haller in Kraków and widely distributed, Łaski's Statutes would remain in force as a fundamental codification of Polish law until the late-18th-century Partitions of the Polish-Lithuanian Commonwealth. Since May 2024, one of copies of the first edition is exhibited at a permanent exhibition in the Palace of the Commonwealth in Warsaw.

== See also ==
- Correctura Iurium
- Nihil novi
- Zamoyski Code
