= Zebrzydowski rebellion =

1609 rebellion in the Polish–Lithuanian Commonwealth

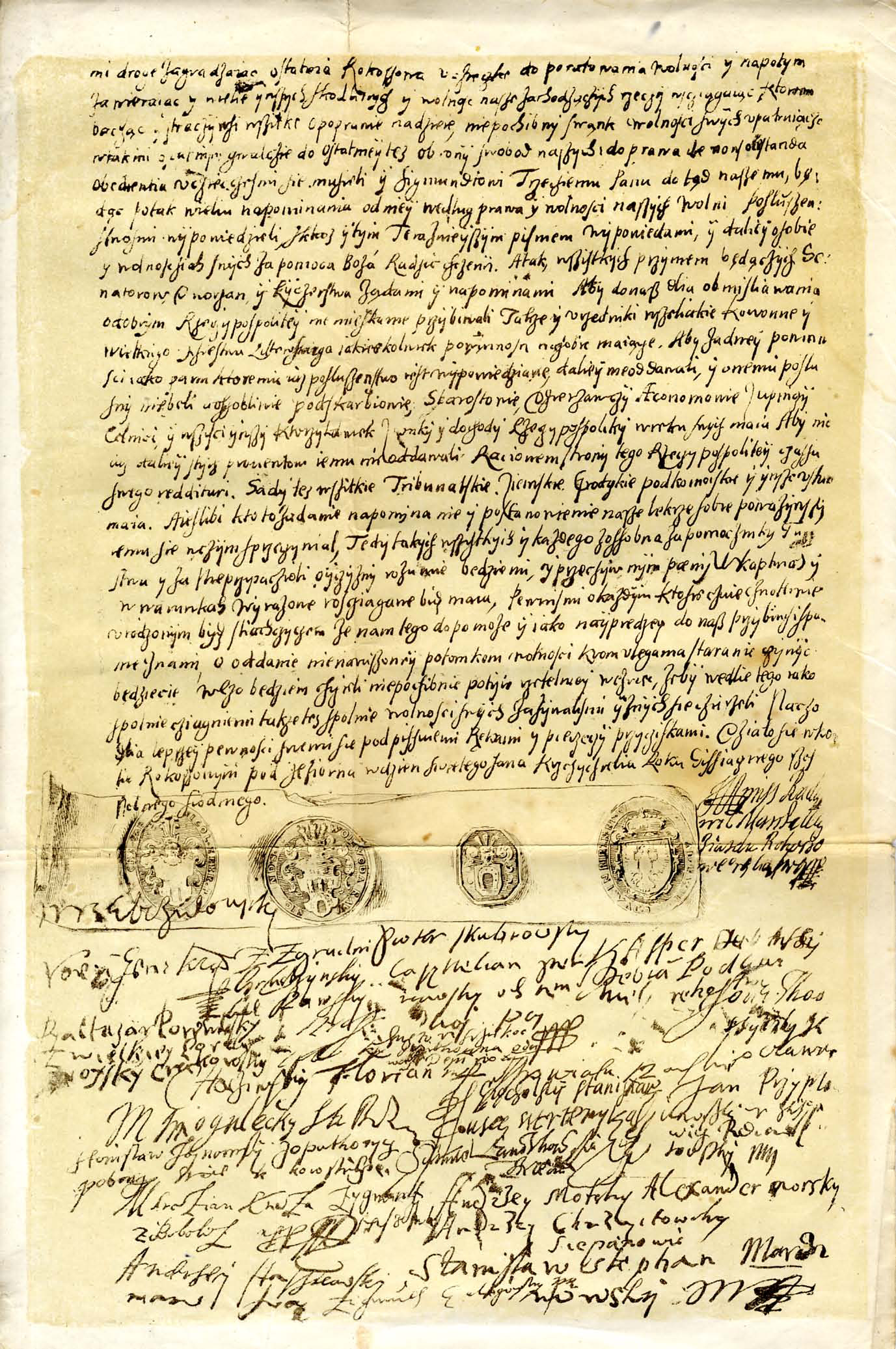
Dethronement of Sigismund III act issued by rokosz June 24, 1607 near Warsaw

Zebrzydowski's rebellion (Polish: rokosz Zebrzydowskiego), or the Sandomierz rebellion (Polish: rokosz sandomierski), was a rokosz (semi-legal rebellion) in the Polish–Lithuanian Commonwealth against King Sigismund III Vasa. The rokosz, formed on 5 August 1606 by Mikołaj Zebrzydowski, Jan Szczęsny Herburt, Stanisław Stadnicki, Aleksander Józef Lisowski, and Janusz Radziwiłł in Stężyca and Lublin, was caused by the growing dissatisfaction with the King among the szlachta (Polish nobility). In particular, the rebels disapproved of the King's efforts to limit the power of the nobles, his attempts to weaken the Sejm (Polish Parliament) and to introduce a hereditary monarchy in place of the elective one. The rebellion (1606–1609) ended in the defeat of the rebels, but the szlachta, in return for their surrender, now controlled the monarchy in the Polish–Lithuanian political system.

The rebellion was sparked by several grievances, including the King's attempts to reduce the power of the magnates and increase the power of the royal court. The rebellion was supported by both Protestant and Catholic magnates; although religious tensions were a factor, the rebels' grievances were broader and reflected more general concerns about the country's direction. The rebels initially achieved some successes with unconventional tactics but were ultimately defeated in a series of battles in early 1607, which had significant repercussions for the Polish-Lithuanian Commonwealth by further weakening an already unstable political system and contributing to a decline in the King's power and prestige.

== History ==
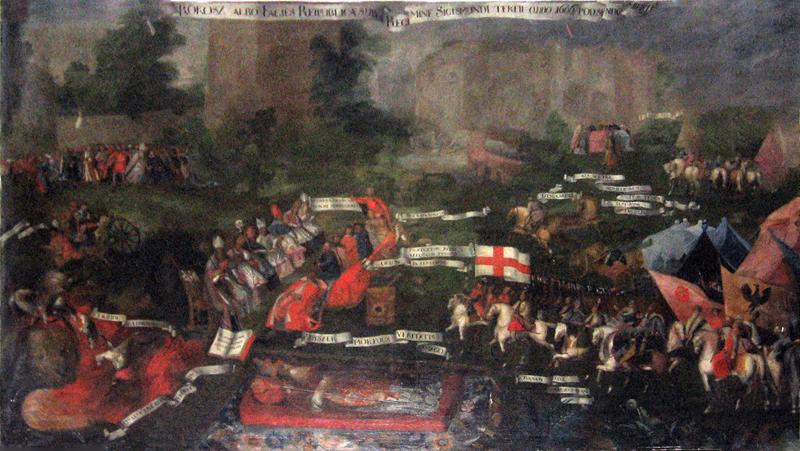
17th-century depiction of the rebellion.

The Polish nobles who gathered at the rokosz formed a konfederacja and outlined their demands in 67 articles. They demanded Sigismund III's dethronement for breaching the Henrician Articles and the expulsion of the Jesuits from the Polish–Lithuanian Commonwealth. They further demanded for the Sejm (Parliament) to appoint state officials, instead of the King; for local officials to be elected, not appointed, and for Protestants' rights to be expanded and protected.

The 1607 Sejm rejected those demands. Meanwhile, the rebel nobles gathered in Guzów. In 1607, the Royal Army, led by Hetman Jan Karol Chodkiewicz, was sent to pacify the rebels. A full-scale battle ensued on July 5 or 6 (sources vary), with 200 casualties, which resulted in the victory of the royal forces.

By 1609, the rebellion was over. Two years after the start of the revolt, the rebellious nobles formally surrendered to the king at the 1609 meeting of the Sejm, which became known as the Pacification Sejm. In return, the rebels were granted leniency. Many royal supporters, including Hetman Chodkiewicz, had successfully argued for amnesty for the rebels.

Despite the failure of the rebellion, it ruined any chance that Sigismund III had to strengthen his role in the government. The Polish historian Oskar Halecki wrote:

The first rebellion in Polish history had sinister consequences. Royalty lost, to great extent, the moral prestige it had enjoyed.... The Polish constitution was henceforth regarded as sacrosanct and the king had to renounce not only the idea of making any far-reaching changes in it, but even any reform.

After the rebellion, King Sigismund attempted to funnel the nobles' restless energy into external wars. That was one factor that led to the official Commonwealth involvement in the Polish–Russian War of 1609–1618, which followed the Dimitriads (1605–1609).

== See also ==
- Lubomirski's Rokosz
- Chicken War
- Nihil novi
