= Propination laws =

Historical Polish alcohol laws

Propination laws were a privilege granted to Polish szlachta (nobility), giving landowners a monopoly over profits from alcohol consumed by their peasants. Propination was a right to distill spirits.

In many cases, profits from propination exceeded those from agricultural production or other sources.

These laws usually included that:

- peasants were not allowed to purchase alcohol not produced in their owner's distillery;
- alternatively, they could be allowed to produce their own alcoholic beverages but had to pay a fee according to the amount produced;
- peasants had to buy at least a given quota of vodka or okovita (aqua vitae). Those who didn't comply had the remaining amount dumped in front of their homes and had to pay the costs.

These laws first appeared in the 16th century and were widespread by the 17th century. They lasted until 1845 in the Prussian partition; 1889 in Galicia; and 1898 in the Russian Partition.

Propination was a principal cause of massive alcoholism in Poland. Also, because taverns in rural areas were leased almost exclusively to Jews who took part in enforcing these privileges, it was also a major cause of antisemitism among peasants.

== See also ==
- Szlachta privileges
- Arendator
