= Incompatibilitas =

1569 Polish law banning the holding of simultaneous offices

Incompatibilitas (Latin, 'incompatibility') was a principle instituted in the Kingdom of Poland (later, from 1569, in the Polish–Lithuanian Commonwealth), which forbade an individual to hold two or more official administrative positions. The principle of incompatibilitas evolved in the 15th-16th centuries in response to a demand from middle and lesser nobility (Szlachta), and it was designed to curtail the sway of more powerful high nobility/aristocracy/plutocracy (the Magnates).

The specific acts of law that constituted the incompatibilitas rule were bans on holding:

- a district office simultaneously with a starosta's office (przywilej czerwiński, 1422);
- two separate district offices;
- a voivode's office simultaneously with a starosta's office (przywilej nieszawski, 1454);
- a kanclerz's (chancellor's) office simultaneously with a starosta's, voivode's or castellan's office;
- a voivode's or castellan's office simultaneously with a starosta's office (1538);
- two or more city starosta offices (starostwo grodowe) (1562 or 1563);
- a voivode's and castellan's offices simultaneously with another ministerial office other than that of hetman (1565, as each of those offices, except that of hetman, granted its holder a seat in the Senate of Poland, a privy council rather than an upper chamber).

Commonwealth ministers were the equivalents of modern central-government officials. There were 10 officials (5 for Poland, 5 for Lithuania): a Great Crown Marshal, Great Lithuanian Marshal, Great Crown Chancellor, Great Lithuanian Chancellor, Crown Deputy Chancellor, Lithuanian Deputy Chancellor, Great Crown Treasurer, Great Lithuanian Treasurer, Court Crown Marshal and Court Lithuanian Marshal. The Court Marshals were considered subordinate to the Great Marshals. Lithuanian ministers, while enjoying the same powers as Crown ministers, were considered to be lower in the hierarchy. Hetmans were also considered "ministers" but had no seat in the Senat.

== See also ==
- Execution movement
- Offices in the Polish–Lithuanian Commonwealth

== Sources ==
- INCOMPATIBILITAS from Polish PWN encyclopedia (for pre-1565 laws), in Polish
- Przemysław Bielewicz on Urzedy Staropolskie, Polish(for 1565 law), in Polish
