= Sejmik =

One of local parliaments in the history of Poland and Lithuania

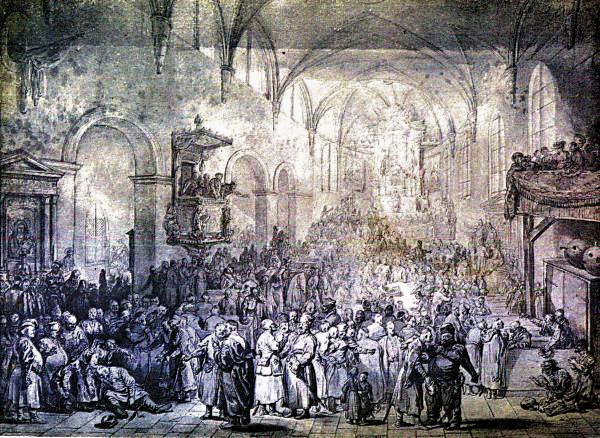
Sejmik in a church, by Jean-Pierre Norblin de La Gourdaine (1745–1830)

A sejmik (Polish pronunciation: [ˈsɛjmʲik], diminutive of sejm, occasionally translated as a dietine; Lithuanian: seimelis) was one of various local parliaments in the history of Poland and history of Lithuania. The first sejmiks were regional assemblies in the Kingdom of Poland (before 1572), though they gained significantly more influence in the later era of the Polish–Lithuanian Commonwealth (18th century). Sejmiks arose around the late 14th and early 15th centuries and existed until the end of the Commonwealth in 1795, following the partitions of the Commonwealth. In a limited form, some sejmiks existed in partitioned Poland (1795–1918), and later in the Second Polish Republic (1918–1939). In modern Poland, since 1999, the term has revived with the voivodeship sejmiks (sejmiki województwa), referring to the elected councils of each of the 16 voivodeships.

The competencies of sejmiks varied over time, and there were also geographical differences. Often, numerous different types of sejmiks coexisted in the same governance structure. Almost always presided over by the marshal, sejmiks could often elect delegates to the national sejm, and sometimes would give such delegates binding instructions. Sejmiks attained the peak of their importance at the turn of the 18th century, when they effectively supplanted the inefficient national sejm.

== Etymology ==
The words sejm and sejmik are cognates with the old Czech sejmovat, which means "to bring together" or "to summon". Both forms originate from Proto-Slavic *sъjьmъ, from *sъ- ("from, with") and *jęti ("to take").

== History ==
The traditions of a sejmik can be traced to the institution of the wiec that actually predates the Polish state. They originated from gatherings of nobility, formed for military and consultative purposes. Historians disagree about the specific date of origin of the sejmiks, with some proposed dates being 1374 (the Privilege of Koszyce) and 1454 (the Nieszawa Statutes). Geographically, sejmiks first arose in central Poland (Greater Poland province). Over the next century or so, they spread to other provinces of Poland, and finally, by the 16th century, to the Grand Duchy of Lithuania. Sejmiks were legally recognized by the 1454 Nieszawa Statutes, in a privilege granted to the szlachta (Polish nobility) by King Casimir IV Jagiellon, when the king agreed to consult with the nobility concerning certain decisions. Casimir's recognition of the sejmik stemmed from an attempt to limit the growing power of the magnates, and counteract it with the middle nobility.

With the creation of a national Sejm in 1493, which took over the powers of taxation and the pospolite ruszenie previously granted to sejmiks at Nieszawa, the importance of regional governance somewhat diminished. Still, the sejmikis continued to play an important role in the governance of Poland as the most direct form of political enfranchisement of the nobility.

In the 1560s, the state organization of the Grand Duchy of Lithuania was reformed in accordance with the Polish model. An act of July 1564 established sejmiks in the Grand Duchy.

After the Union of Lublin in 1569, the Polish–Lithuanian Commonwealth had about 70 sejmiks (out of those, 24 were in the Grand Duchy of Lithuania). Jacek Jędruch notes a trend of an increasing number of sejmiks over time, from about 16 in the 15th century to 104 by the late 18th century, as nobility sought to meet in places that required less travel time. Stanisław Płaza also estimates about 100 at the turn of the 18th century. Those sejmiks elected 170 deputies (48 from Lithuania). Most sejmiks elected 2 deputies, but there were exceptions. (Note: For a full list of sejmiks and the numbers of deputies elected, see Sejm walny#Composition) Wojciech Kriegseisen notes that until the late 18th century, there were 44 sejmiks in Poland proper (the Crown of the Kingdom of Poland), 24 in Lithuania, and 1 in Inflanty province.

The sejmik's role grew again in the late 17th century, as central power weakened. Sejmiks attained the peak of their importance at the turn of the 18th century, when they often set their own time limits—that is, they extended their authorized periods of operation. In the face of an inefficient central government, with the national Sejm often disrupted by the liberum veto and the office of starosta losing much of its importance, sejmiks administered a portion of the taxes, and raised their own military (wojsko powiatowe). This period, which was known as the "rule of sejmiks" (rządy sejmikowe), was brought to an end by acts of the one-day Silent Sejm (Polish: sejm niemy) of 1717, which removed most taxation and military competences from the sejmiks. Some sejmiks were also affected by liberum veto until it was abolished for sejmiks in 1766; this was not always the case, as some decided to forgo unanimity and move to majority rule.

Where the middle nobility had been the leading force at the sejmiks in the 16th century, the magnates became increasingly influential in the 18th century. This stemmed from their ability to bribe masses of poorly educated, landless nobility (known as magnate's "clients" or "clientele"), as all nobles were eligible to vote in the sejmiks. Sejmiks in Lithuania were dominated by the magnates to a greater extent than those in Poland proper, as the Lithuanian magnates were more powerful than their Polish counterparts. The magnate-dominated sejmiks, which gathered impoverished nobility, have been described as more concerned with eating and drinking than debate; for the poorest of nobility, they were a rare occasion to participate in feasts sponsored by the magnates. When they met, the drunken nobility was known to fight among themselves, which on occasion led to fatalities.

Sejmiks were significantly reformed by the Prawo o sejmikach, the act on regional sejms, passed on 24 March 1791 and subsequently recognized as part of the Constitution of 3 May. This law introduced major changes to the electoral ordinance, as it reduced the enfranchisement of the noble class. The voting right became tied to a property qualification; to be eligible to vote, a noble had to own or lease land and pay taxes, or be closely related to another who did. Some 300,000 out of 700,000 otherwise eligible nobles were thus disfranchised, much to their displeasure. A document from 1792 lists only 47 sejmiks.

Although the independent existence of the Commonwealth ended with the partitions of Poland in 1795, the institution of the sejmik continued, albeit in a somewhat restricted fashion. In the Duchy of Warsaw, sejmiks elected deputies to the Sejm of the Duchy of Warsaw. Similarly, sejmiks of Congress Poland elected deputies to the Sejm of Congress Poland until its abolishment in 1831. Even in the Lithuanian territories incorporated into the Russian Empire, some judicial sejmiks were allowed to elect lower court judges; it was the only elective representative institution to survive in the Lithuanian territories after the partition. In the Prussian partition there were provincial sejmiks (Provinziallandtag) and powiat sejmiks (Kreistag). Near the turn of the century, some limited local representative institutions existed in the Russian partition and Austrian partition, but they did not bear the name of sejmiks.

After Poland regained independence, provincial sejms were restored in the Second Polish Republic, although they were called sejms rather than sejmiks. They included the short-lived Sejm of Central Lithuania (1921–1922); the three voivodeship sejms (Silesian Parliament, Greater Poland Sejm, and Pomeranian Sejm, 1920–1939), which preserved the tradition of sejmiks in the former Prussian partition; and the county sejmiks, of which there were 264 in 1939. The existence of these institutions was interrupted by the occupation of Poland during the Second World War, and they were not reestablished in the era of communist Poland.

The sejmiks were revived again after the fall of communism in modern Poland. Since 1999, the term sejmik (in full, sejmik województwa) has been used to refer to the elected council of each of the 16 voivodeships or regions (see voivodeship sejmik). The word sejmik was chosen by lawmakers in order to eliminate the term rada wojewódzka (voivodeship council), which conjured memories of voivodeship people's councils during the communist Poland era.

== Sejmiks of the Polish–Lithuanian Commonwealth ==
=== Features ===
Sejmiks were usually held in a large, open field. The nobility would elect a presiding officer (marszałek sejmiku: sejmik marshal), whose role was analogous to the marshal of the sejm at national Sejms. (This term has been revived since 1999, but it now refers to the chairman of the voivodeship executive board rather than the presiding officer of the sejmik itself.) While the sejmiks were originally convened by the king, soon a loophole was exploited: the sejmiks would limit the number of issues discussed, using that as a pretext to reconvene later at a time chosen by the marshal. Voivodes and starosts also had the ability to convene some sejmiks. Until the reforms of the Constitution of 3 May, all the nobility residing in the territory that was holding a sejmik were eligible to participate in the sejmik.

It is estimated that most sejmiks drew around 4 to 6% of eligible participants.

=== Types ===
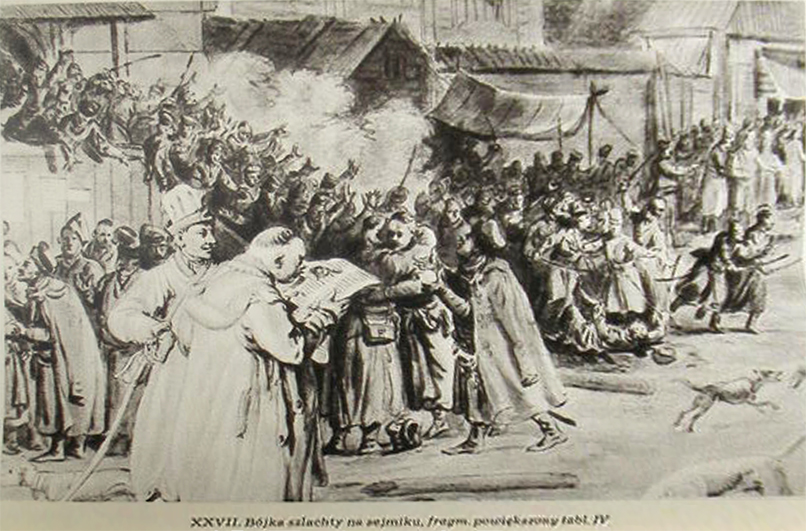
Nobility fighting at a sejmik, Jean-Pierre Norblin de La Gourdaine

Historians distinguish several types of sejmiks, depending on their geographical scope:

- General (Polish: generalny, Latin conventiones generales), held in western Poland (Greater Poland) at Koło, in southern Poland (Little Poland) at Nowe Miasto Korczyn, in Masovia at Warsaw, in Red Ruthenia at Sądowa Wisznia (Sudova Vyshnia), and in Lithuania at Wołkowysk (Vawkavysk). The General Sejmiks were composed of delegates elected at the provincial sejmiks, and of Senators. Their goal was to agree on a position for the General Sejm (Sejm Walny) and issue instructions for the deputies on how they were supposed to vote during the General Sejm. The competences of the general sejmiks were defined by precedent and custom rather than law; on rare instances when external circumstances prevented a national Sejm from being convened (such as 1511, 1513 and 1577), the general sejmiks were seen as competent to legislate on national matters. In the 15th century some general sejmiks reserved the right to accept or reject national legislation. In the 16th century they were tasked with preparing drafts of legislation to be discussed at Sejms. Around the 17th century general sejmiks were mostly abandoned (with the exceptions of those in Royal Prussia, see Prussian estates); instead, provincial deputies would meet in special sessions during the Sejm proper.
- Provincial, Territorial, Voivodeship or County (Polish: ziemski, Latin conventiones particulares, conventiones terrestrae). The names of these sejmiks varied depending on their administrative level and local traditions; Płaza lists powiat sejmiks (county sejmiks; sejmiki powiatowe), ziemia sejmiks (territorial sejmiks; sejmiki ziemskie), voivodeship sejmiks (sejmiki wojewódzkie) and provincial sejmiks (sejmiki prowincjonalne). A theoretical hierarchy that almost never existed in practice could be drawn starting from the powiat sejmiks, and moving upwards to ziemia, voivodeship, general (of several voivodeships) and provincial sejmiks ending with the final, national sejm. Almost all ziemias had their own sejmiks, but the importance of the sejmik varied based on whether the given ziemia was autonomous (that is, whether it was part of a voivodeship). Powiat sejms were common in Lithuania, but were rare in the Crown of Poland, where instead voivodeship sejms were much more common. Some voivodeships could hold a single voivodeship sejmik, and others might be covered by more than one sejmik. The importance of the local sejmiks began to diminish with the formation of the national sejm. Thereafter the local sejmiks were relegated to dealing with local matters and electing deputies to the General Sejms. They rose in importance again in the second half of the 17th century, as the central Sejm grew weaker.

Kriegseisen, quoting Adam Lityński, argues that there was only one type of sejmik and that the only difference between various sejmiks was the purpose for which they were convened. Nonetheless, other scholars often distinguish between different types of sejmiks. Juliusz Bardach and Jędruch, for example, divide sejmiks based on their purpose as follows:

- Pre-sejm (Polish: przedsejmowe) sejmiks were convened by the king who sent a writ (legacja królewska) to each sejmik, outlining the reasons the next Sejm would be held. Such sejmiks elected one to six deputies (poslowie), depending on the size and importance of the sejmik's territory, to the ordinary General Sejm (Polish: Sejm Walny) that was held every two years, and to any extraordinary General Sejm that might be called at any time in an emergency. Sometimes pre-sejm sejmiks were referred to as electoral. In some cases, a sejmik could be called for two voivodeships – in that case it could elect more than 6 deputies. Deputies were given instructions on how to vote during the sejm proper, although on occasion the instructions could be vague, or even give the deputies full freedom. These sejmiks arose in the late 15th century.
- Relational or Debriefing (Polish: relacyjne) sejmiks heard the reports of deputies returned from the General Sejm, usually presenting the law (konstytucje sejmowe) decreed by the Sejm. They passed specific instructions with regards to the execution of sejm decrees, and other local resolutions. Such sejmiks could also receive special requests from the king; this happened if the sejmik deputy was bound by instructions not to vote on certain issues that subsequently were voted on and passed in the national sejm. In such cases the king would request the sejmik to reconsider their decision and support the national legislation. These sejmiks arose in the 16th century.
- Electoral (Polish: elekcyjne) sejmiks elected higher voivodeship officials, judges in particular. They were convened irregularly, as such offices were usually held for life. Several candidates would be nominated, and the king would make the final appointment from among them. These sejmiks arose in the 15th century.
- Deputational or Judicial (Polish: deputackie) sejmiks met on a yearly basis and elected deputies (deputaci) to tribunals (Crown Tribunal and Lithuanian Tribunal) from the times of King Stefan Batory onwards (starting in 1578 in Poland, and from 1581 in Lithuania).
- Administrative or Economic (Polish: gospodarcze) sejmiks oversaw voivodeship self-government. Often, they were held on the day following the deputational sejmik. Their decrees were known as laudas. Some of the specific issues that these sejmiks addressed included: dealing with taxation (distribution of national taxes) and tax collectors, managing the local (voivodeship) taxes and treasury, recruiting local military and (from mid-1700s) election of deputies to the Treasury Tribunals. These sejmiks arose in the early 16th century.
- Hooded (Polish: kapturowe) sejmiks had special powers during an interregnum. These sejmiks were organized as confederations, and would elect confederation officials. The name was derived from hoods worn in the period of royal mourning. These sejmiks began during the interregnum of 1572.

== Assessment and historiography ==
Kriegseisen notes that the institution of the sejmik gained a negative reputation following the partitions of Poland, and it has been described as one of the dysfunctional elements of the Polish political system that contributed to the fall of the Commonwealth. He cautions against such simplistic assessments, and traces them to 18th century publications whose negative views of the sejmiks have been rarely challenged since. The stereotype of a group of drunken, fighting nobility, found in some literature, should not be seen as representative, particularly outside the period of the sejmik's decline in the 18th century. He argues that while many sensationalist descriptions of debauchery, brawling or outright bloody violence at sejmiks have survived, they did so because they were just that—sensationalist—and should be seen as exceptions to the long, uneventful, but usually constructive proceedings that were much more common.

Kriegseisen also remarks that there is a myth about the uniqueness of sejmiks to Poland, and notes that similar institutions of self-governance and regional parliamentary participation by nobility can be found in other places, such as in Hungary and various German provinces (Silesia, Prussia, Brandenburg).

== Locations of provincial (or territorial) sejmiks ==
The following is a list of locations at which the provincial (or territorial) sejmiks were held.

=== Province of Lesser Poland ===
- Bełz (for Bełz Voivodeship), four envoys elected to the Sejm,
- Chełm (for the Land of Chełm), two envoys elected,
- Czernihów (for Czernihów Voivodeship), four envoys elected,
- Halicz (for the Lands of Halicz, Kołomyja, and Trembowla), six envoys elected,
- Kamieniec Podolski (for Podole Voivodeship), four envoys elected,
- Łuck (for Wołyń Voivodeship), six envoys elected,
- Opatów (for Sandomierz Voivodeship), six envoys elected,
- Proszowice (for Kraków Voivodeship), six envoys elected,
- Urzędów, also Lublin (for Lublin Voivodeship, three envoys elected,
- Winnica (for Bracław Voivodeship), three envoys elected,
- Sądowa Wisznia (for the Lands of Lwów, Sanok, and Przemyśl), six envoys elected,
- Zator (for the Duchy of Oświęcim, and the Duchy of Zator), one envoy elected,
- Żytomierz (for Kijów Voivodeship), three envoys elected.

=== Province of Greater Poland ===
- Bielsk (for the County of Bielsk), two envoys elected,
- Ciechanów (for the Land of Ciechanów), two envoys elected,
- Czersk (for the Land of Czersk), two envoys elected,
- Drohiczyn (for the County of Drohiczyn), two envoys elected,
- Gąbin (for the Land of Gostynin), two envoys elected,
- Lipno (for the Land of Dobrzyń), two envoys elected,
- Liw (for the Land of Liw), two envoys elected,
- Łomża (for the Land of Łomża), two envoys elected,
- Mielnik (for the County of Mielnik), two envoys elected,
- Nur (for the Land of Nur), two envoys elected,
- Parzęczew (for Łęczyca Voivodeship), two envoys elected,
- Raciąż (for Płock Voivodeship), four envoys elected,
- Radziejów (for Brześć Kujawski Voivodeship and Inowrocław Voivodeship), four envoys elected,
- Rawa Mazowiecka (for the Land of Rawa), two envoys elected,
- Różan (for the Land of Różan), two envoys elected,
- Sochaczew (for the Land of Sochaczew), two envoys elected,
- Szadek (for Sieradz Voivodeship), two envoys elected,
- Środa Wielkopolska (for Kalisz Voivodeship and Poznań Voivodeship), twelve envoys elected,
- Warsaw (for the Land of Warsaw), two envoys elected,
- Wieluń (for the Land of Wieluń and the County of Ostrzeszów), two envoys elected,
- Wizna (for the Land of Wizna), two envoys elected,
- Wyszogród (for the Land of Wyszogród), two envoys elected,
- Zakroczym (for the Land of Zakroczym), two envoys elected.

=== Royal Prussia ===
- Człuchów (for the County of Człuchów), two envoys elected,
- Kowalewo Pomorskie ( for Chełmno Voivodeship), two envoys elected,
- Malbork (for Malbork Voivodeship), two envoys elected,
- Mirachowo (for the County of Mirachowo), two envoys elected,
- Puck (for the County of Puck), two envoys elected,
- Starogard Gdański (for the Counties of Gdańsk, Tczew, Nowe, and in 1642–1655 for the Lębork – Bytów Land), two envoys elected; in 1642–1655, four envoys elected,
- Świecie (for the County of Świecie), two envoys elected,
- Tuchola (for the County of Tuchola), two envoys elected.

=== Grand Duchy of Lithuania ===
- Brasław (for the County of Brasław), two envoys elected,
- Brześć (for the County of Brześć), two envoys elected,
- Grodno (for the County of Grodno), two envoys elected,
- Kowno (for the County of Kowno), two envoys elected,
- Lida (for the County of Lida), two envoys elected,
- Mińsk (for the County of Mińsk), two envoys elected,
- Mozyrz (for the County of Mozyrz), two envoys elected,
- Mścisław (for Mścisław Voivodeship), two envoys elected,
- Nowogródek (for the County of Nowogródek), two envoys elected,
- Orsza (for the County of Orsza), two envoys elected,
- Oszmiana (for the County of Oszmiana), two envoys elected,
- Pińsk (for the County of Pińsk), two envoys elected,
- Połock (for Połock Voivodeship), two envoys elected,
- Poniewież (for the County of Upita), two envoys elected,
- Rosienie (for the Duchy of Samogitia), two envoys elected,
- Rzeczyca (for the County of Rzeczyca), two envoys elected,
- Słonim (for the County of Nowogródek), two envoys elected,
- Smoleńsk (for the County of Smoleńsk), two envoys elected,
- Starodub (for the County of Starodub), two envoys elected,
- Troki (for the County of Troki), two envoys elected,
- Wilno (for the County of Wilno), two envoys elected,
- Wiłkomierz (for the County of Wiłkomierz), two envoys elected,
- Witebsk (for the County of Witebsk), two envoys elected,
- Wołkowysk (for the County of Wołkowysk), two envoys elected.

=== Duchy of Livonia ===
- According to the 1598 bill of the Sejm, regional sejmiks for Livonia took place in Kieś, in some cases also in Ryga. After Swedish conquest of most of Livonia in the 1620s, the sejmiks were moved to Dyneburg. The nobility of the County of Piltyń, formally equal to the nobility of the Commonwealth, did not elect any envoys to the Sejm.

== See also ==
- Estates of the realm
- Voivodeships of Poland
