= Proclamation of Połaniec =

Proclamation that sought to abolish serfdom in the Polish–Lithuanian Commonwealth

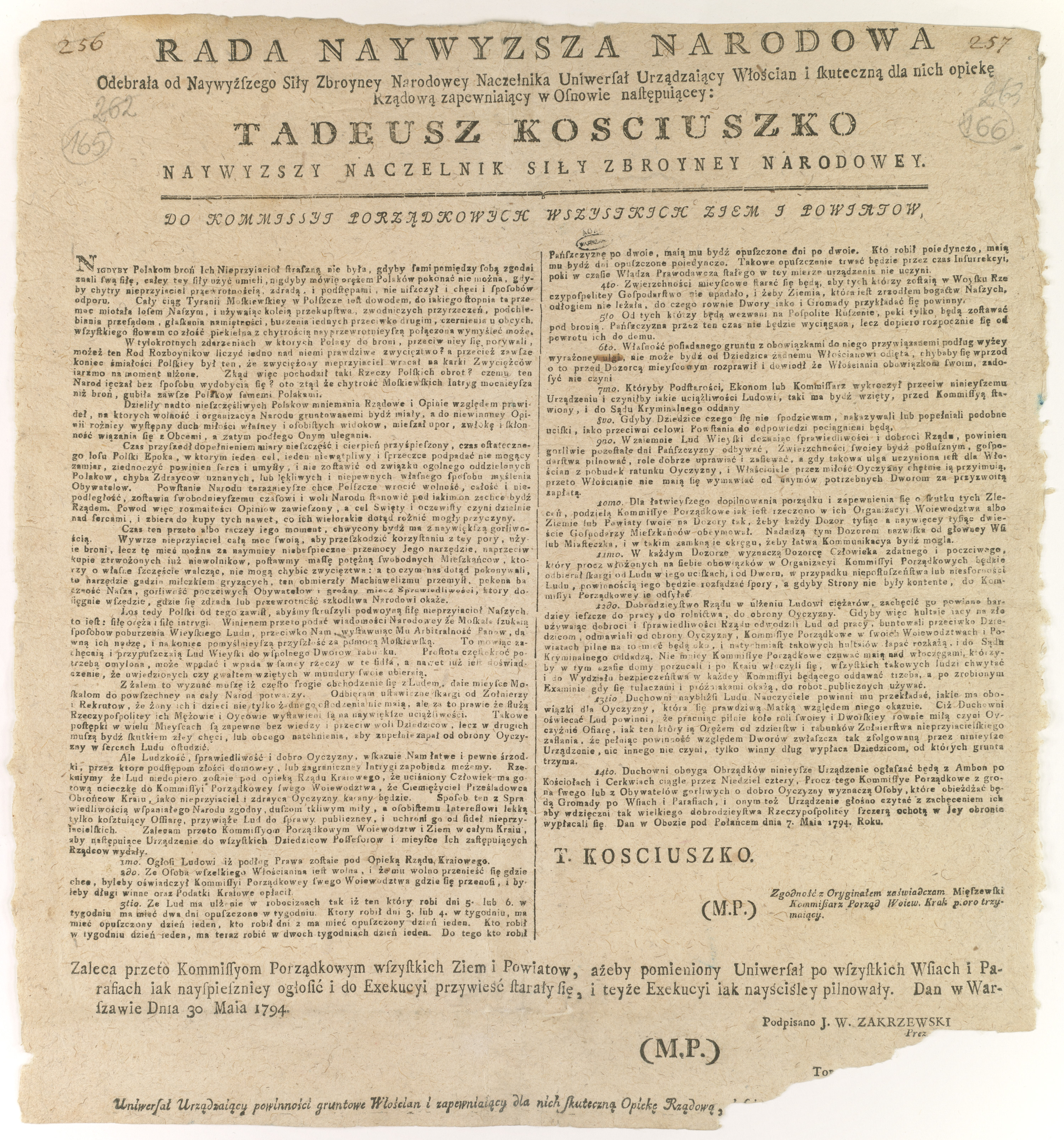
- Copy of the Proclamation, printed in Warsaw on 30 May 1794. From the collections of the Central Archives of Historical Records
- Original title: Uniwersał Połaniecki
- Presented: 7 May 1794
- Location: Połaniec, Sandomierz Voivodeship, Polish–Lithuanian Commonwealth

The Proclamation of Połaniec (also known as the Połaniec Manifesto; Polish: Uniwersał Połaniecki), issued on 7 May 1794 by Tadeusz Kościuszko near the town of Połaniec, was one of the most notable events of Poland's Kościuszko Uprising, and the most famous legal act of the Uprising. It partially abolished serfdom in Poland, granting substantial civil liberties to all the peasants. The motives behind the Połaniec Proclamation were twofold: first, Kościuszko, a radical and reformer, believed that serfdom was an unfair system and should be ended; second, the uprising was in desperate need of recruits, and freeing the peasants would prompt many to enlist.

The proclamation provided the peasants with the personal freedom, right for assistance from the state against the abuses of the Polish nobility (szlachta) and gave them specific property rights to the land they cultivated. Although this new law never fully came into being and was boycotted by much of the szlachta, it also attracted many peasants to the ranks of the revolutionists, resulting in the formation of the famous kosynierzy peasant infantry, the most famous of whom, Bartosz Głowacki, became one of the heroes of the Uprising. It was the first time in Polish history when the peasants were officially regarded as part of the nation, the word being previously equal to szlachta.

This was the second legal act issued by the reformed Polish state (the first being the Constitution of May 3, considered the second oldest constitution in the world, and was the expansion of the 4th act of that constitution. It was also the last legal act of the Commonwealth, and just like the constitution that made it possible, it had a short lifespan and negligible impact on most of Commonwealth citizens. In many places where revolutionary forces could not enforce it, the local szlachta simply ignored the proclamation. However the news of the proclamation spread among the peasantry and was kept alive by the revolutionary and patriotic minded Poles. Over the next several decades, after the partitions of Poland ended the existence of Poland as a separate state, it became one of the symbols of Polish history.

The proclamation specifically granted to peasants:

- limited personal freedom
- reduction of serfdom during the current crisis and promise of further reduction after the end of hostilities
- freeing from serfdom of all peasants conscripted to the military
- the right not to be removed from their land
- limited right to appeal to the state's courts
- introduction of the dozorca office, the first government official representing the peasant will to the government. Dozorca represented about 1000 families, and he was supposed to enforce the proclamation

== See also ==
- Declaration of the Rights of Man and of the Citizen, a similar act

== Quote ==
Announce to the people that, according to law, they are under the protection of the nation's government; that the person subject to any lord, is liberated.
