= Statutes of Nieszawa =

The Nieszawa Statutes (Polish: statuty nieszawskie) were a set of laws enacted in the Kingdom of Poland in 1454, in the town of Nieszawa located in north-central Poland. The King Casimir IV Jagiellon made a number of concessions to the Polish nobility and the gentry (szlachta) in exchange for their support in the Thirteen Years' War. Among other things, the Statutes required the King to seek the lords' approval when issuing new laws, when levying the mobilisation of armed forces (pospolite ruszenie), or when imposing new taxes. The Statutes strengthened the position of some of the nobility at the expense of less agreeable estates.

With the Statute of Nieszawa, King Casimir (1427–1492) – who was a brother of Władysław III of Poland (1424–1444), the new King of Hungary – also managed to take further advantage of the political split between the richest and most influential Polish families, and the much broader class of szlachta. The statute substantially limited the power of the former in exchange for the new privileges bestowed upon the latter. From then on, szlachta consent was required in the passing of new laws, as well as, for the declaration of war. Equally important, was the significant reduction in the autonomy of the Church controlled by Cardinal Zbigniew Oleśnicki (one of the most powerful magnates). It allowed the king to appoint Catholic bishops himself.

== See also ==
- Piotrków Statutes
- Szlachta's privileges
