= Rokosz =

A rokosz (Polish pronunciation: [ˈrɔkɔʂ]) originally was a gathering of all the Polish szlachta (nobility), not merely of deputies, for a sejm. The term was introduced to the Polish language from Hungary, where analogous gatherings took place at a field called Rákos. With time, "rokosz" came to signify an armed, semi-legal rebellion by the szlachta of the Polish–Lithuanian Commonwealth against the king, in the name of defending threatened liberties. The nobles who gathered for a rokosz formed a "confederation".

The institution of the rokosz, in the latter sense, derived from the medieval right to resist royal power. The rokosz took its authority from the right to refuse obedience to the king, as stipulated in the Privilege of Mielnik (przywilej mielnicki, signed October 23, 1501) and later in the Henrician Articles of 1573.

Two of the best-known rokoszes are the 17th-century Zebrzydowski Rebellion and the 16th-century Chicken War.

== See also ==
- Golden Liberty
- Lubomirski's Rokosz
