= Polish–Lithuanian union =

Former union of European states

Map of Poland and Lithuania in 1466 under Kazimierz Jagiellończyk

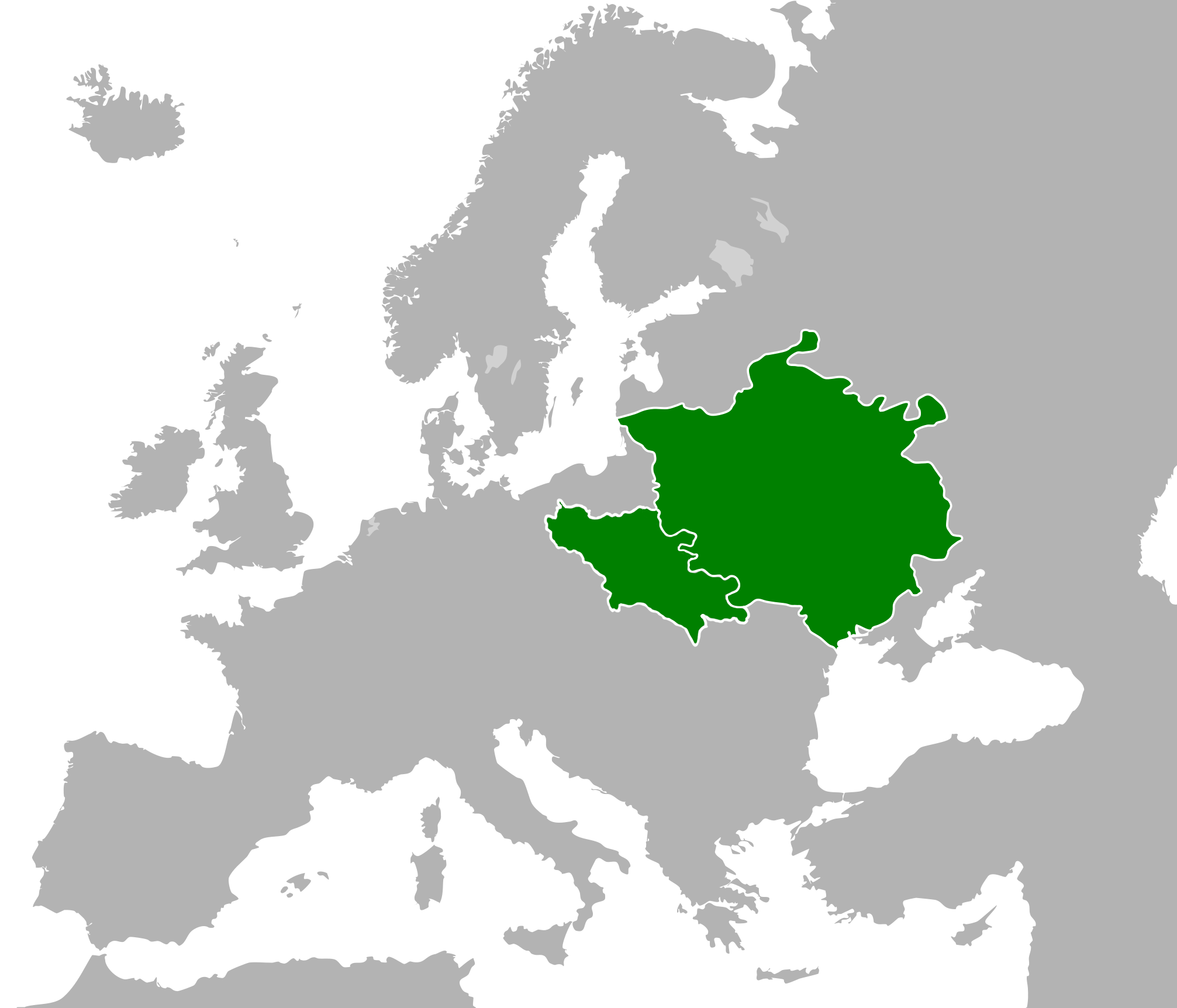
Map of Poland and Lithuania in 1430 under Władysław II Jagiełło

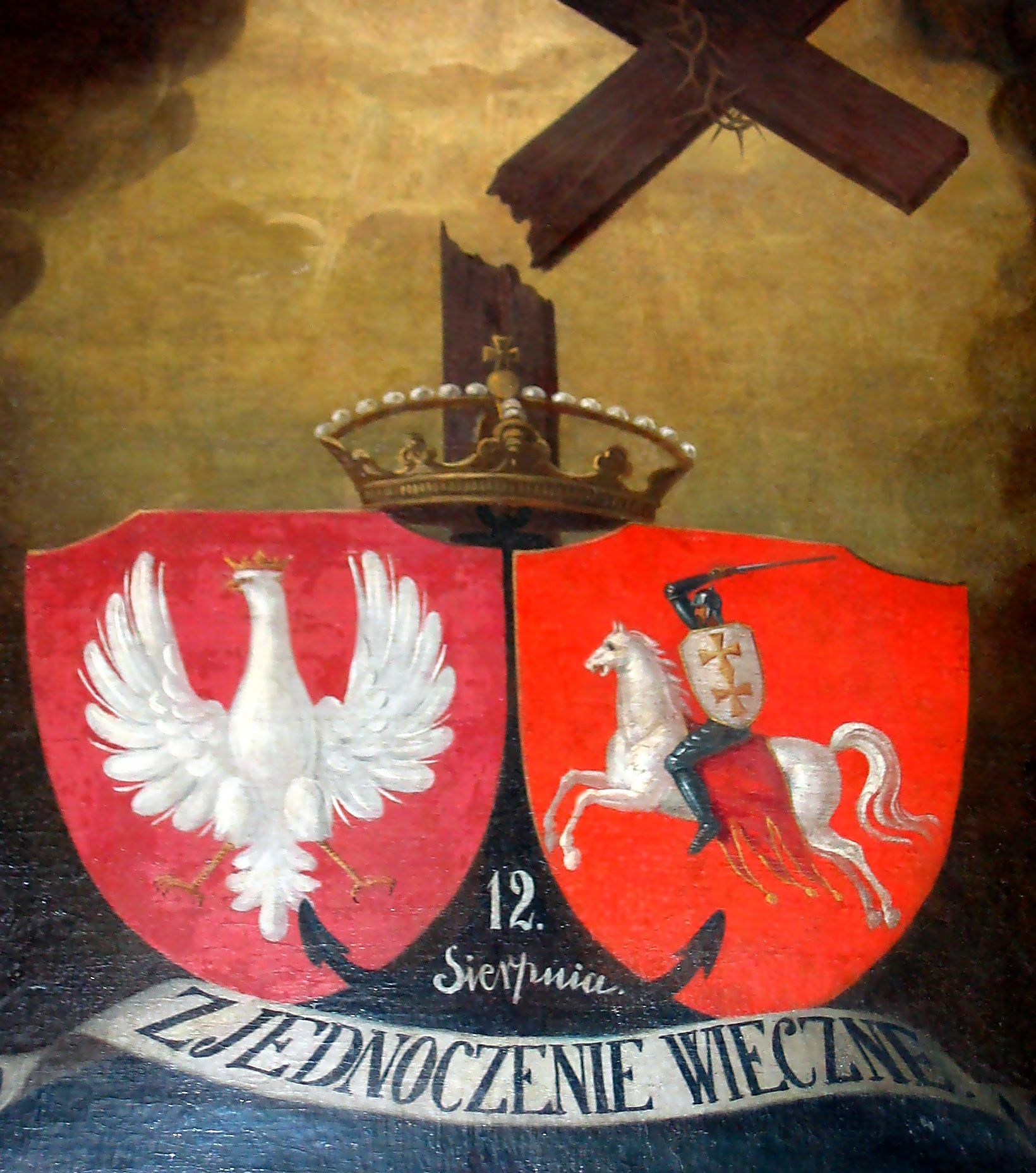
Painting commemorating Polish–Lithuanian union; ca. 1861. The motto reads "Eternal union".

The Polish–Lithuanian union was a relationship created by a series of acts and alliances between the Crown of the Kingdom of Poland and the Grand Duchy of Lithuania that lasted for prolonged periods of time from 1385 and led to the creation of the Polish–Lithuanian Commonwealth, or the "Republic of the Two Nations", in 1569, which ended in 1795 with the Third Partition.

== History ==
Important historical events included:

- 1385 – Union of Krewo, a personal union that brought the Grand Duke of Lithuania, Jogaila (Władysław II Jagiełło), to the Polish throne as a result of his marriage to Jadwiga of Poland in February 1386
- 1401 – Union of Vilnius and Radom, which strengthened the Polish–Lithuanian union
- 1413 – Union of Horodło, a treaty requiring Polish and Lithuanian noblemen to organize congresses to resolve issues of common interest. Essentially a heraldic union, the treaty granted many szlachta rights to Lithuanian nobility.
- 1432 (1432–34) – Union of Grodno, a declarative attempt to renew a closer union
- 1499 – Union of Kraków and Vilnius in which the personal union became a dynastic union and recognised the sovereignty of Lithuania and described relations between the two states
- 1501 – Union of Mielnik, a renewal of the personal union
- July 1, 1569 – Union of Lublin, a real union that resulted in creation of the semi-federal, semi-confederal Republic of the Two Nations (Polish–Lithuanian Commonwealth)
- May 3, 1791 – Polish Constitution of May 3, 1791: abolished the elective monarchy and turned it into a hereditary monarchy and established a common state, the Rzeczpospolita Polska (Polish Commonwealth), in its place. The Reciprocal Guarantee of Two Nations modified the changes by stressing the continuity of binational status of the state. The changes were reversed completely in 1792 under pressure from the Russian Empire. In any case, the two Partitions carried out by Berlin and Saint Petersburg (in 1793, and 1795) led to the final collapse of the Commonwealth.

== See also ==
- Polish–Lithuanian–Ruthenian Commonwealth
- Polish–Lithuanian–Muscovite Commonwealth
- Union of Kėdainiai
- Polish–Swedish union
