= Privilege (law) =

Entitlement or immunity of a certain group

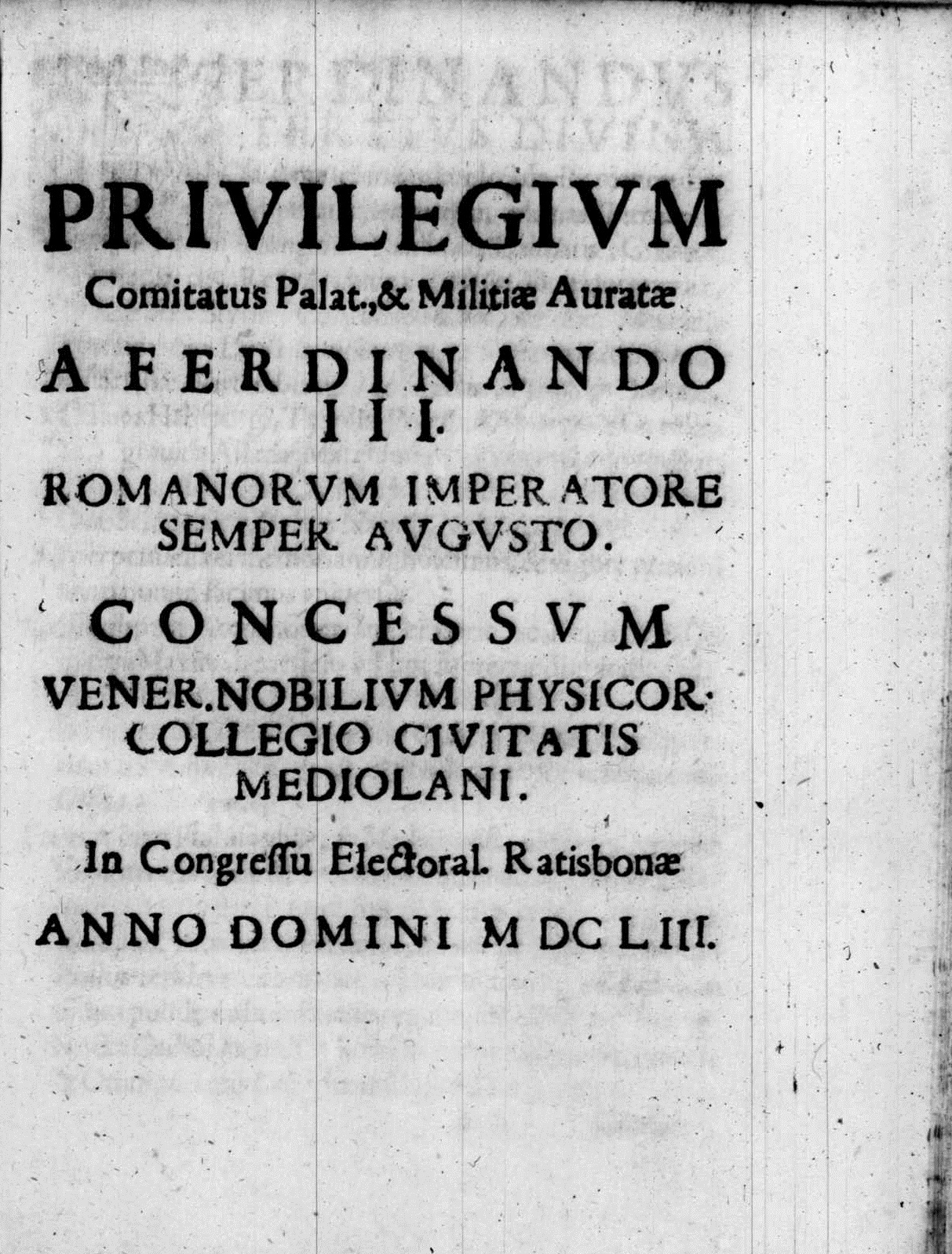
Privilegiu m comitatus palatinus et militikñ ae aurataei a Ferdinando Tertiuo, 1653. This privilege was granted by Ferdinand III of Habsburg, emperor of the Holy Roman Empire, to the important College of physicians of Milan, Italy.

A privilege is a certain entitlement to immunity granted by the state or another authority to a restricted group, either by birth or on a conditional basis. Land-titles and taxi medallions are examples of transferable privilege – they can be revoked in certain circumstances. In modern democratic states, a privilege is conditional and granted only after birth. By contrast, a right is an inherent, irrevocable entitlement held by all citizens or all human beings from the moment of birth. Various examples of old common law privilege still exist – to title deeds, for example. Etymologically, a privilege (privilegium) means a "private law", or rule relating to a specific individual or institution.

The principles of conduct that members of the legal profession observe in their practice are called legal ethics.

Boniface's abbey of Fulda, to cite an early and prominent example, was granted privilegium, setting the abbot in direct contact with the pope, bypassing the jurisdiction of the local bishop.

One of the objectives of the French Revolution was the abolition of privilege. This meant the removal of separate laws for different social classes (nobility, clergy, and ordinary people), instead subjecting everyone to the same common law. Such privileges were abolished by the National Constituent Assembly on August 4, 1789.

== See also ==
- Executive privilege
- Parliamentary privilege
- Privilege (canon law)
- Privilege (evidence)
- Privilège du blanc
- Privilege of peerage
- Social privilege
- Szlachta's privileges
