= Statutes of Piotrków =

Set of laws in 1496 by King John I Albert regarding nobles

The Piotrków Statutes (Polish: statuty piotrkowskie) were a set of laws enacted in the Kingdom of Poland in 1496. King John I Albert made a number of concessions to the nobility, whose support he required in war. Among other things, the nobles were relieved of certain taxes and were granted exclusive rights to high Church offices.

Additionally city burghers were forbidden from holding royal and national offices, while the peasants were restricted in their mobility; according to the statutes, only one peasant was allowed to leave his home village per year and only one member of a peasant family was allowed to move to the towns.

The statute also removed all tariffs on internal trade along waterways.

== See also ==
- Nieszawa Statutes
- Szlachta's privileges
