= Union of Kraków and Vilna =

1499 agreement between Poland and Lithuania

The Union of Kraków and Vilna, also known as Union of Vilnius, was one of the agreements of the Polish–Lithuanian union. It was signed in Kraków by the Polish nobility on 6 May 1499, and in Vilnius by the Lithuanian nobility on 24 July 1499.

== Background ==
Casimir IV Jagiellon was both King of Poland and Grand Duke of Lithuania. In his last will, Casimir stipulated that the two states would be ruled separately by two of his sons. Thus, after his death in 1492, John I Albert was elected to the Polish throne, while the Lithuanian Council of Lords chose Alexander Jagiellon. Thus, the personal union between Poland and Lithuania was broken. The union at that time could be described as a dynastic union.

In the late 1490s, Poland faced pressure from the Crimean Khanate and the Ottoman Empire, while Lithuania faced the Grand Principality of Moscow. Ivan III claimed that he inherited rights to all Russian and Orthodox lands after the fall of the Byzantine Empire. His ambitions led to beginnings of the century-long Muscovite–Lithuanian Wars. After the Tatars invaded Volhynia and Podolia in late 1494, John Albert suggested a military and further political alliance to his brother Alexander. He agreed, but negotiations dragged until spring 1498, when the Tatars invaded Podolia and Galicia and took thousands of prisoners. Reacting to these threats and wishing to secure Lithuanian military assistance, Polish nobles agreed with all Lithuanian suggestions and demands.

== Description ==
The Union of Vilnius was based on the Union of Horodło of 1413. It was an alliance of two equal states. It was agreed that future rulers of both countries would be chosen separately, but with consent of the other state. The Union also provided for mutual aid and assistance in various armed conflicts. Historian Tomas Baranauskas interpreted it as the most advantageous for Lithuania of all Polish–Lithuanian unions. However, almost immediately Polish nobles began protesting the union on a technicality – the act referenced the Union of Horodło, which they did not have available.
