= Pospolite ruszenie =

Mobilisation of armed forces in Poland–Lithuania

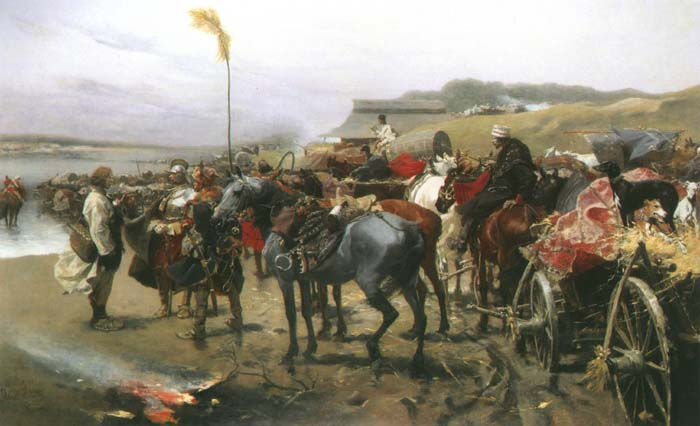
Józef Brandt, Pospolite Ruszenie at a River Ford, 1880

Pospolite ruszenie (Polish pronunciation: [pɔspɔˈlitɛ ruˈʂɛɲɛ], lit. mass mobilization; "Noble Host", Latin: motio belli, the French term levée en masse is also used) was the wartime mobilisation of all or a specific part of able-bodied male population of the state into armed forces during the period of the Kingdom of Poland and the Polish–Lithuanian Commonwealth. The tradition of wartime mobilisation of part of the population existed from before the 13th century to the 19th century. In the later era, pospolite ruszenie units were formed from the szlachta (Polish "nobility"). The pospolite ruszenie was eventually outclassed by professional forces.

== Rise ==
Before the 13th century, the feudal levy of knights was the customary method employed in the raising of Polish armies in the Kingdom of Poland of the Late Middle Ages. The earliest mentions of the term can be traced to the reign of Władysław I the Elbow-high (1320–1333). Statutes of Casimir the Great made the service in the military obligatory for all knights-landowners, under the penalty of land confiscation. The more wealthy knights provided a lances fournies unit (known in Poland as kopia), and the less prosperous ones served as a light horseman or even infantryman. They were obliged to take arms and defend the country, and to participate in wars in foreign lands.

As the knights (later, nobles - the szlachta class) started to acquire privileges, some of them began to change the way that the pospolite ruszenie functioned. The length of the service was set at two weeks. The Privilege of Buda of 1355 required the king to compensate any losses incurred by the nobles in wars abroad, and the Privilege of Koszyce of 1374 required him to pay the ransom for any nobles taken into captivity during wars abroad. A privilege of 1388 extended that compensation for losses incurred when defending the country and confirmed that the nobles were to receive a monetary wage for their participation and that they should be consulted with by the king beforehand.

The early pospolite ruszenie also put the requirement of military service on the landowning knights in the priesthood, and on the peasant leaders (sołtys and wójts). The few townsfolk who owned land estates would also have the obligation to serve. It could be called by the king, or in his absence and in dire need, from the 14th century, the starost of the affected territory. From 1454 another privilege (the Privilege of Cerkwica, confirmed the same year by the Statutes of Nieszawa) made the calling of a pospolite ruszenie conditional on the agreement of the local sejmik (regional parliament) and, by the end of the 15th century, this required the agreement of the national parliament, the sejm. Some of the above privileges were extorted by the szlachta from the king, as a pospolite ruszenie was known to refuse to act unless more privileges were granted to it (this was the case, for example, in 1454).

Pospolite ruszenie units were usually organized based on a territorial and administrative division of Kingdom of Poland (later, the Polish–Lithuanian Commonwealth), within units known as voivodeships (Latin 'palatinate'), and smaller ones. The knights (nobles) would be gathered by castellans and voivodes, who led them to the chosen points where the command would pass to the military commanders (hetmans) or the king. The units would be organized into units of about 50-120 strong (chorągiew), based on their territorial origin. There were some exceptions, as the most powerful magnates would form their own chorągiews.

== Decline ==
Szlachta from regions like the Commonwealth's eastern and southern borderlands, where combat was common, created fairly competent units, while those from peaceful regions of the Commonwealth lacked battle experience and training compared to regular-military troops or mercenaries. In time, pospolite ruszenie became increasingly amateurish and inefficient when compared to professional soldiers; Bardach notes that this process can be seen as early as the Thirteen Years' War (1454–66). In addition to the lack of training, discipline and unstandardized equipment, the time it took for a pospolite ruszenie to be called to arms and gathered in a designed spot (often, close to a month) was also a problem. Some attempts at reform the situation, including a mass wave of estate confiscations at 1497, and a requirement for yearly gatherings and reviews, did little to ameliorate the situation.

From the 15th century, pospolite ruszenie levies were used less often than were professional military troops. By mid-16th century, pospolite ruszenie could, in theory, have fielded about 50,000 troops.

By the 17th century, the military value of the pospolite ruszenie was very limited, and was last called to participate in the Battle of Warsaw of 1656 during The Deluge (the battle ended with a Polish defeat). Nonetheless, the szlachta continued to believe they formed an elite army, and that their participation in the defense of the country was an important reason for their privileged position in it. As this was used as a justifications for lower taxation, the Commonwealth treasury found itself increasingly starved for funds to pay to regular, standing army. With the Commonwealth Army reduced by that time to around 16,000, it was easy for its neighbors to overpower its armies (the Imperial Russian Army numbered 300,000; the Prussian Army and Imperial Austrian Army, 200,000).

== Final reforms, partitions and the Second Polish Republic ==
During the Kościuszko Uprising in 1794, under the influence of revolutionary France and Enlightenment ideas about the role of the militia, pospolite ruszenie was redefined as consisted of not only the nobility, but all able-bodied males between 18 and 40 years of age. In 1806, by decree of Napoleon, the pospolite ruszenie in the Duchy of Warsaw served for a short period as the reserve force and recruitment pool for the regular army. During the November Uprising in 1831, the Sejm (Polish Parliament) called for pospolite ruszenie recruits from the ages of 17 to 50, but that plan was opposed by General Jan Zygmunt Skrzynecki.

During the Second Republic of Poland (1918–1939), the pospolite ruszenie consisted of reserve soldiers, aged 40–50 and officers, aged 50–60. They were required to participate in army exercises and to serve in armed forces during times of war.

== See also ==
- Landsturm
- Narodnoe Opolcheniye
