= Nihil novi =

1505 Polish constitutional document

Nihil novi nisi commune consensu ("Nothing new without the common consent") is the original Latin title of a 1505 act or constitution adopted by the Polish Sejm (parliament), meeting in the royal castle at Radom.

== Etymology ==
The Latin expression, "nihil novi" ("nothing new"), had previously appeared in the Vulgate Bible phrase, "nihil novi sub sole" ("there is nothing new under the sun"), in Ecclesiastes 1:9.

"Nihil novi" in this political sense, is interpreted in the vernacular as "Nothing about us without us" (in Polish, "Nic o nas bez nas").

== History ==
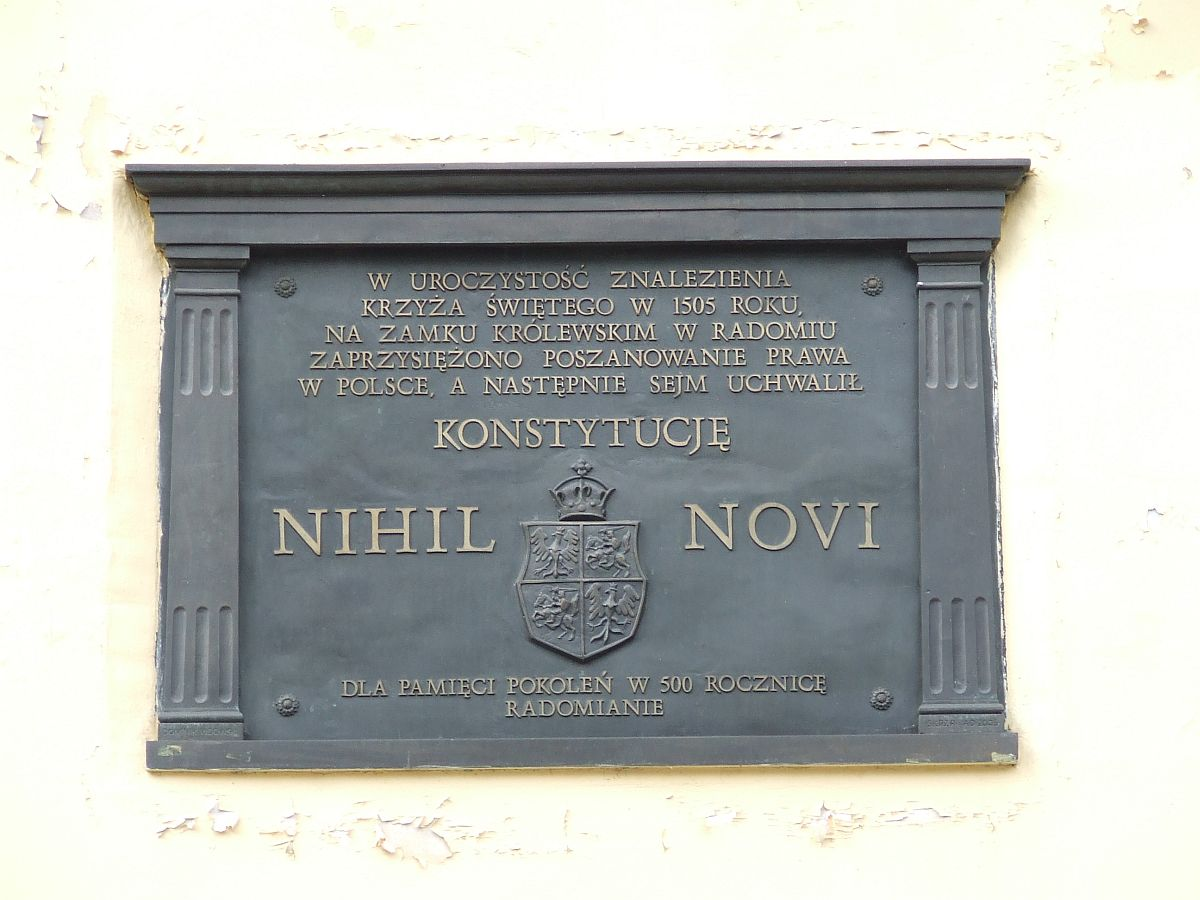
Plaque at Radom Castle, commemorating 500th anniversary of adoption there, in 1505, of Act of Nihil novi

Nihil novi effectively established "nobles' democracy" in what came to be known as the Polish "Commonwealth [or Republic] of the Nobility". It was a major component of the evolution and eventual dominant position of the Polish parliament (Sejm).

== Nihil novi ==
The act of Nihil novi was passed in 1505 during a Sejm session in Radom (sejm of Radom (1505)) that lasted from 30 March to 31 May and was held at the royal castle in Radom. It was signed by King Alexander Jagiellon on 31 March and adopted by the Sejm on 30 May.

The Sejm's 1505 Act of Nihil novi nisi commune consensu marked an important victory for Poland's nobility over her kings. It forbade the king to issue laws without the consent of the nobility, represented by the Senat and Chamber of Deputies, except for laws governing royal cities, crown lands (królewszczyzny), mines, fiefdoms, royal peasants, and Jews.

Nihil novi invalidated the Privilege of Mielnik, which had strengthened only the magnates, and it thus tipped the balance of power in favor of the Chamber of Deputies (the formally lower chamber of the Parliament), where the ordinary nobility held sway. This initiated the period in Polish history known as the "Nobles' Democracy," a limited democracy giving suffrage to male nobility (szlachta), who at the time made up more than 10 percent of the Republic's population.

== Text ==
Whereas general laws and public acts pertain not to an individual but to the nation at large, wherefore at this General Sejm held at Radom we have, together with all our kingdom's prelates, councils and land deputies, determined it to be fitting and just, and have so resolved, that henceforth for all time to come nothing new shall be resolved by us or our successors, without the common consent of the senators and the land deputies, that shall be prejudicial or onerous to the Commonwealth [or "Republic"] or harmful and injurious to anyone, or that would tend to alter the general law and public liberty.

== See also ==
- List of Latin phrases
- Nothing About Us Without Us
- Polish–Lithuanian Commonwealth
- Szlachta privileges

== Sources ==
- Norman Davies, God's Playground: A History of Poland in Two Volumes. Volume I: The Origins to 1795, New York, Columbia University Press, 1982, ISBN 0-231-05351-7.
- Sebastian Piątkowski, Radom: zarys dziejów miasta (Radom: A Brief History of the City), Radom, 2000, ISBN 83-914912-0-X.
- Adam Zamoyski, The Polish Way: A Thousand-Year History of the Poles and Their Culture, New York, Hippocrene Books, 1994, ISBN 0-7818-0200-8.
