= Szlachta =

Noble class in the Kingdom of Poland and the Grand Duchy of Lithuania

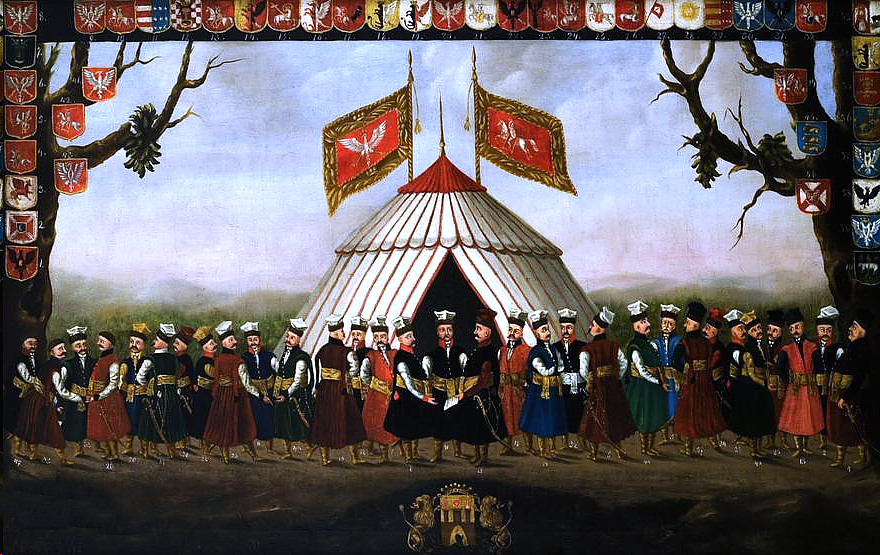
Szlachta in costumes of the voivodeships of the Crown of the Kingdom of Poland, Grand Duchy of Lithuania and the Polish–Lithuanian Commonwealth in the 17th and 18th century.

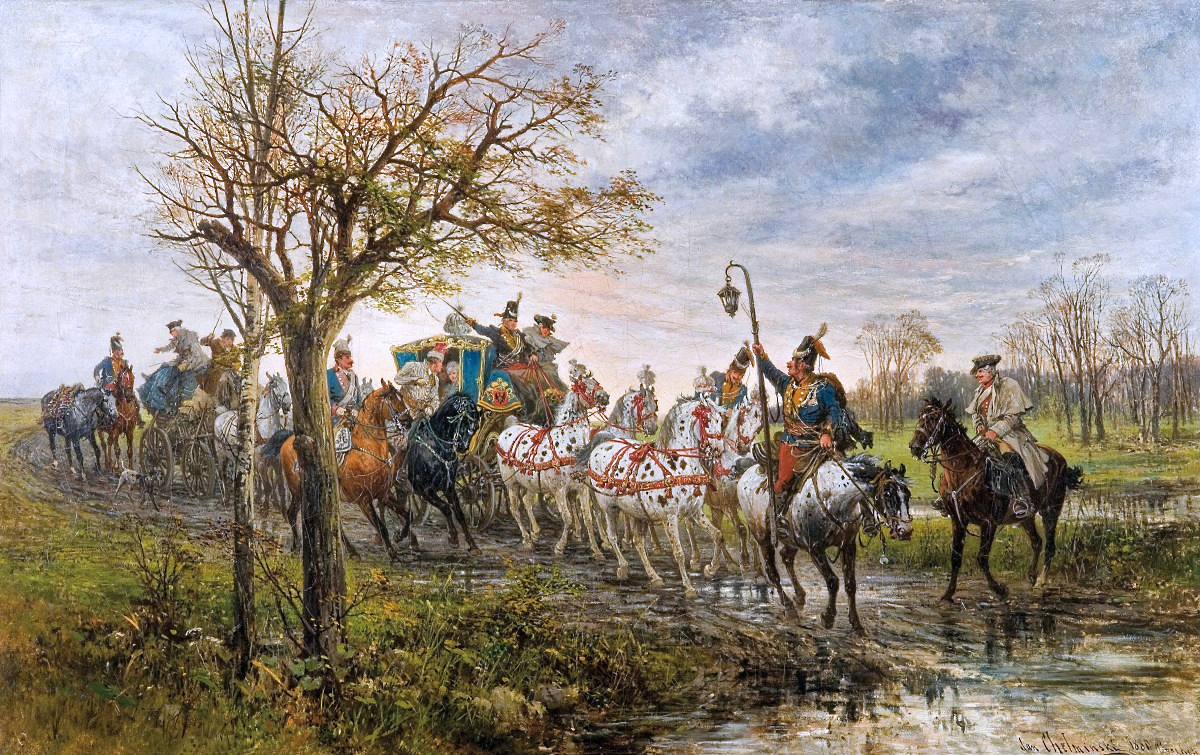
Journey of a Polish Lord During the Times of King Augustus III of Poland, by Jan Chełmiński, 1880.

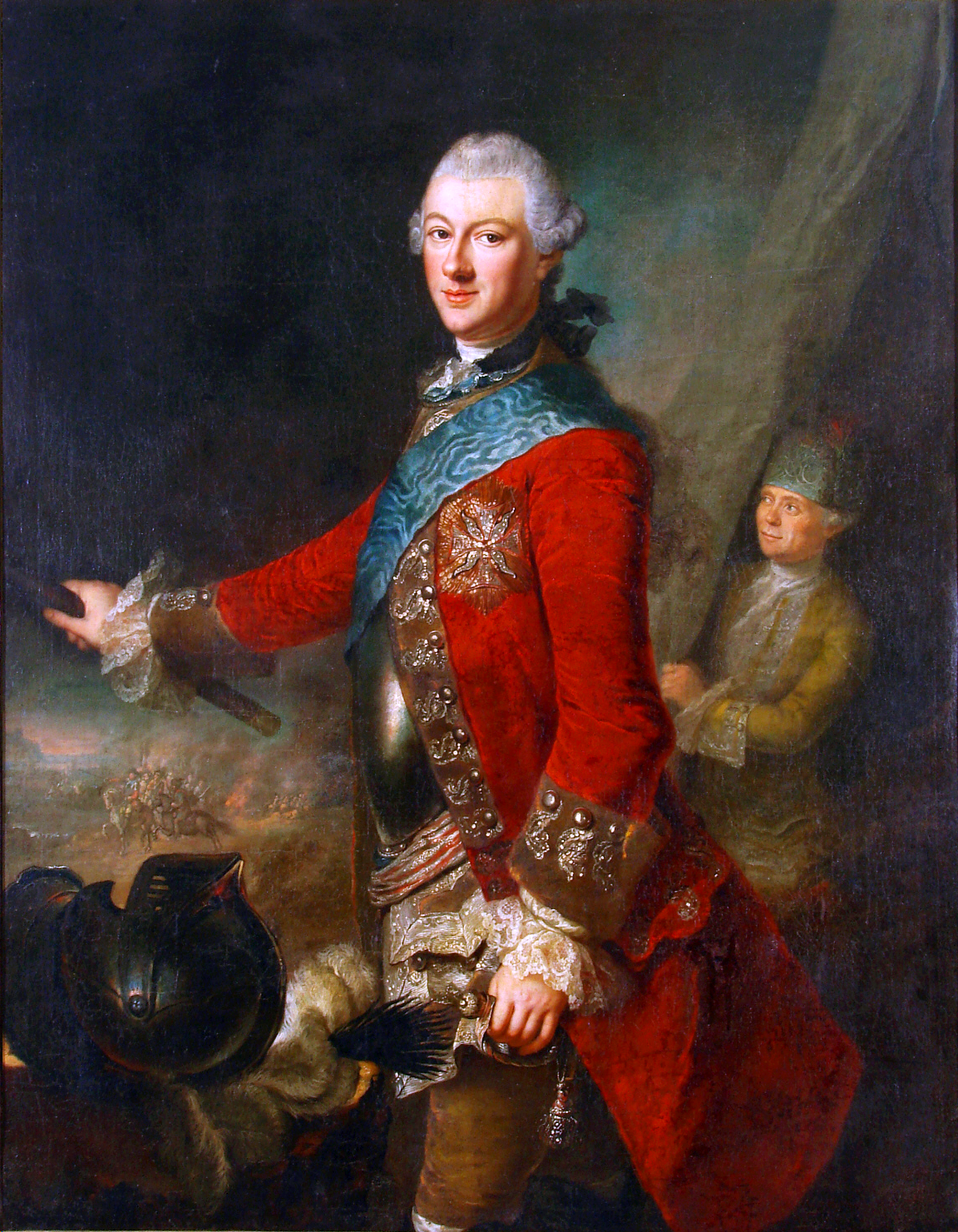
Michał Kazimierz Ogiński, a nobleman from 18th century Poland and the Enlightenment

The szlachta (Polish pronunciation: [ˈʂlaxta]; Lithuanian: šlėkta; Ruthenian: шляхта, translit: šlachta) were the hereditary noble estate in the Kingdom of Poland, the Grand Duchy of Lithuania, and the Polish–Lithuanian Commonwealth. It was the dominating social class in the Kingdom of Poland and the Commonwealth, which was exercising political rights and power. Polish noble class differed substantially from the feudal nobility of Western Europe. The estate was officially abolished in 1921 by the March Constitution.

The origins of the szlachta are obscure and the subject of several theories. The szlachta secured substantial and increasing political power and rights throughout its history, beginning with the reign of King Casimir III the Great between 1333 and 1370 in the Kingdom of Poland until the decline and end of the Polish–Lithuanian Commonwealth in the late 18th century. Apart from providing officers for the army, its chief civic obligations included electing the monarch and filling honorary and advisory roles at court that would later evolve into the upper legislative chamber, the Senate. The szlachta electorate also took part in the government of the Commonwealth via the lower legislative chamber of the Sejm (bicameral national parliament), composed of representatives elected at local sejmiks (local noble assemblies). Sejmiks performed various governmental functions at local levels, such as appointing officials and overseeing judicial and financial governance, including tax-raising. The szlachta assumed various governing positions, including voivode, marshal of voivodeship, castellan, and starosta.

In 1413, following a series of tentative personal unions between the Grand Duchy of Lithuania and the Crown of the Kingdom of Poland, the existing Lithuanian and Ruthenian nobilities formally joined the Polish nobility. As the Polish–Lithuanian Commonwealth (1569–1795) evolved and expanded territorially after the Union of Lublin, its membership grew to include the leaders of Ducal Prussia and Livonia. Over time, in the nobility grew to encompass around 8% to 10% of Polish-Lithuanian society, which made the electorate that was several times larger than all noble classes in other European countries; by contrast, nobles in Italy and France encompassed 1% and England’s less than 1% during the early modern period.

Despite often enormous differences in wealth and political influence, few distinctions in law existed between the great magnates and lesser nobles. The juridic principle of nobles’ equality existed because noble land titles were allodial, not feudal, involving no requirement of feudal service to a liege Lord. Unlike absolute monarchs who eventually took reign in most other European countries, the Polish king was not an autocrat and not the absolutist tyrant. During the three successive Partitions of Poland between 1772 and 1795, most of the nobles began to lose legal privileges and social status, while noble elites became part of the nobilities of the three partitioning powers.

== History ==
=== Etymology ===
In Polish, a nobleman is called a "szlachcic" and a noblewoman a "szlachcianka".

Some early Polish historians state the term have derived from the name of the legendary proto-Polish Lechitic prince, Lech, mentioned in Polish and Czech sources. The szlachta traced their descent from Lech, who founded the Polish kingdom in about the fifth century. The word szlachta derives directly from the word Lech/Lach— z Lach-ta/z-Lech-ta, meaning “ from the Lach/Lech”, “the ród/house of the Lech/Lach”, “ the people of the Lech/Lach” (notice in the words Lech and Lach we have the vowel shift known as “przegłos”, specific grammatical feature in the Slavonic languages). Polish and Lechitic language are synonymous. In antiquity and early medieval periods Polish people were known as Lechites (“Regnum Lechorum sive Polonorum” and other sources). The name of Poland is the name of the Christianized Poland, used from the medieval period when the Lechitic Prince Mieszko from the Lechitic tribe of Polans was baptised, accepted Christianity and joined the pope-recognised monarchs of Christian Europe. In many languages Poland was and is always called Lechia, Lechistan, Lehistan, Lahestan, Lengyelorsag, Lenkija, etc.

The Polish term szlachta designated the formalized, hereditary aristocracy of the Kingdom of Poland and the Polish–Lithuanian Commonwealth, which constituted the nation itself, and ruled without competition. In official Latin documents of the old Commonwealth, the hereditary szlachta were referred to as nobilitas from the Latin term. Until the second half of the 19th century, the Polish term obywatel (which now means "citizen") could be used as a synonym for noble landlords.

The word szlachta literally translates as nobility. It also denote some non-hereditary honorary knighthoods and baronial titles granted by other European monarchs, including the Holy See. Szlachta also denotes the Ruthenian and Lithuanian nobility from before the Polish-Lithuanian Commonwealth.

In the past, a misconception sometimes led to the mistranslation of "szlachta" as "gentry" rather than "nobility". This mistaken practice began due to the inferior economic status of many szlachta members compared to that of the richer nobility in some other countries (see also Estates of the Realm regarding wealth and nobility). The szlachta included those rich and powerful l, the great magnates and the impoverished with a noble and aristocratic lineage, but with no land, no castle, no great wealth, and no subject peasants. Historian M.Ross wrote in 1835: "At least 60,000 families belong to the noble class, of which, however, only about 200 are very rich and wealthy;." From the very principle and in Polish culture the true nobility ultimately derives from the peoples’ purest, kindest, gentlest character qualities and virtues, courage, wisdom and care and protection of the weaker, and roots, not from the amount of money.

The exceptionally wealthy and powerful noble families constituted the magnateria and were known as magnates (magnates of Poland and Lithuania).

=== Composition ===
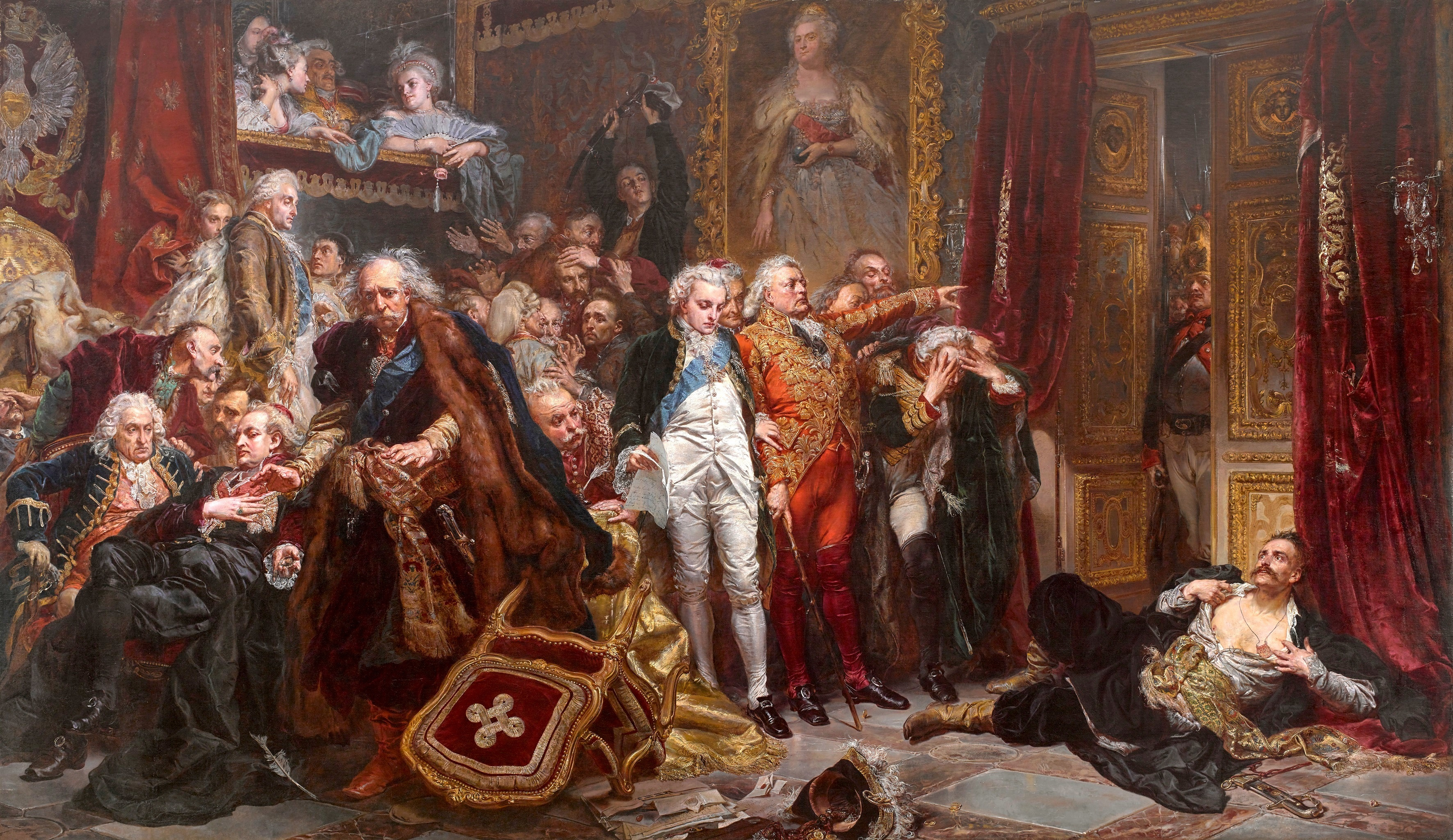
Szlachcic sejmik representative Tadeusz Rejtan (lower right), with szlachta republican right of ending any Senate (Sejm) session and nullifying any legislation passed (Liberum veto), defying Russian, Prussian, and Austrian autocratic might to cease legalization of the First Partition of Poland, by halting the Partition Sejm's exit from the Senate chamber on 30 September 1773, in effect proclaiming, "Murder me, not Poland." Painting by Jan Matejko, 1866

Adam Zamoyski argues that the szlachta were not exactly the same as the European nobility nor a gentry, as the szlachta fundamentally differed in law, rights, political power, origin, and composition from the feudal nobility of Western Europe. The szlachta did not rank below the king, as the szlachta's relationship to the Polish king was not feudal. The szlachta stood as equals before the king. The king was not an autocrat, nor the szlachta's overlord, as szlachta land was in allodium, not feudal tenure. Feudal dependence upon a Polish king did not exist for the szlachta and earlier in history some high-ranking szlachta (magnates) descending from past tribal dynasties regarded themselves as co-proprietors of Piast realms and constantly sought to undermine Piast authority.

In 1459 Ostroróg presented a memorandum to the Sejm (parliament), submitting palatines, or Voivodes of the Polish–Lithuanian Commonwealth, receive the title of prince. Sons of a prince were to receive titles of counts and barons. Castellans of the Polish–Lithuanian Commonwealth were to receive the title of count. This attempt to introduce the hierarchy of noble titles common for European feudal systems for szlachta was rejected.

The fact the szlachta were equal before the king and deliberately opposed becoming a feudal nobility became a matter of law embedded as a constitutional principle of equality. The republicanism of ancient Rome was the szlachta's ideal. Poland was known as the Most Serene Republic of Poland, Serenissima Res Publica Poloniae. The szlachta, not as a feudal nobility or gentry, but as an electorate, and an aristocracy and warrior caste, with no feudal dependence on a king, exercised supreme political power over that republic and elected kings as servants of a republic the szlachta regarded as the embodiment of their rights.

Over time, numerically most lesser szlachta became poorer, or were poorer than, their few rich peers with the same political status and status in law, and many lesser szlachta were worse off than commoners with land. While the strict economic narrative places the szlachta zagrodowa at peasant-level destitution, there is a compelling, alternative sociological argument that treats them as an agrarian "upper-middle class." This perspective relies on structural and socio-political frameworks rather than literal cash flow as defined in strictly postmodern late stage capitalist terms. A prominent source for this exact comparative framing comes from Danish cultural critic and historian Georg Brandes in his historical observations of Poland, as preserved in his scholarly cultural and economic scholastic journal paper overviews.They were called szlachta zagrodowa, that is, "farm nobility", from zagroda, a farm, often little different from a peasant's dwelling, sometimes referred to as drobna szlachta, "petty nobles" or yet, szlachta okoliczna, meaning "local". Particularly impoverished szlachta families were often forced to become tenants of their wealthier peers. They were described as szlachta czynszowa, or "tenant nobles" who paid rent. See "Szlachta categories" for more.

=== Origins ===
==== Poland ====
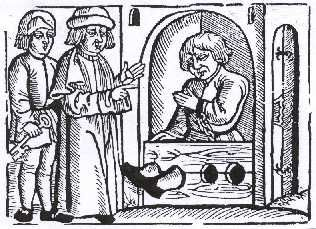
A Polish peasant in stocks in a 16th-century Polish woodcut

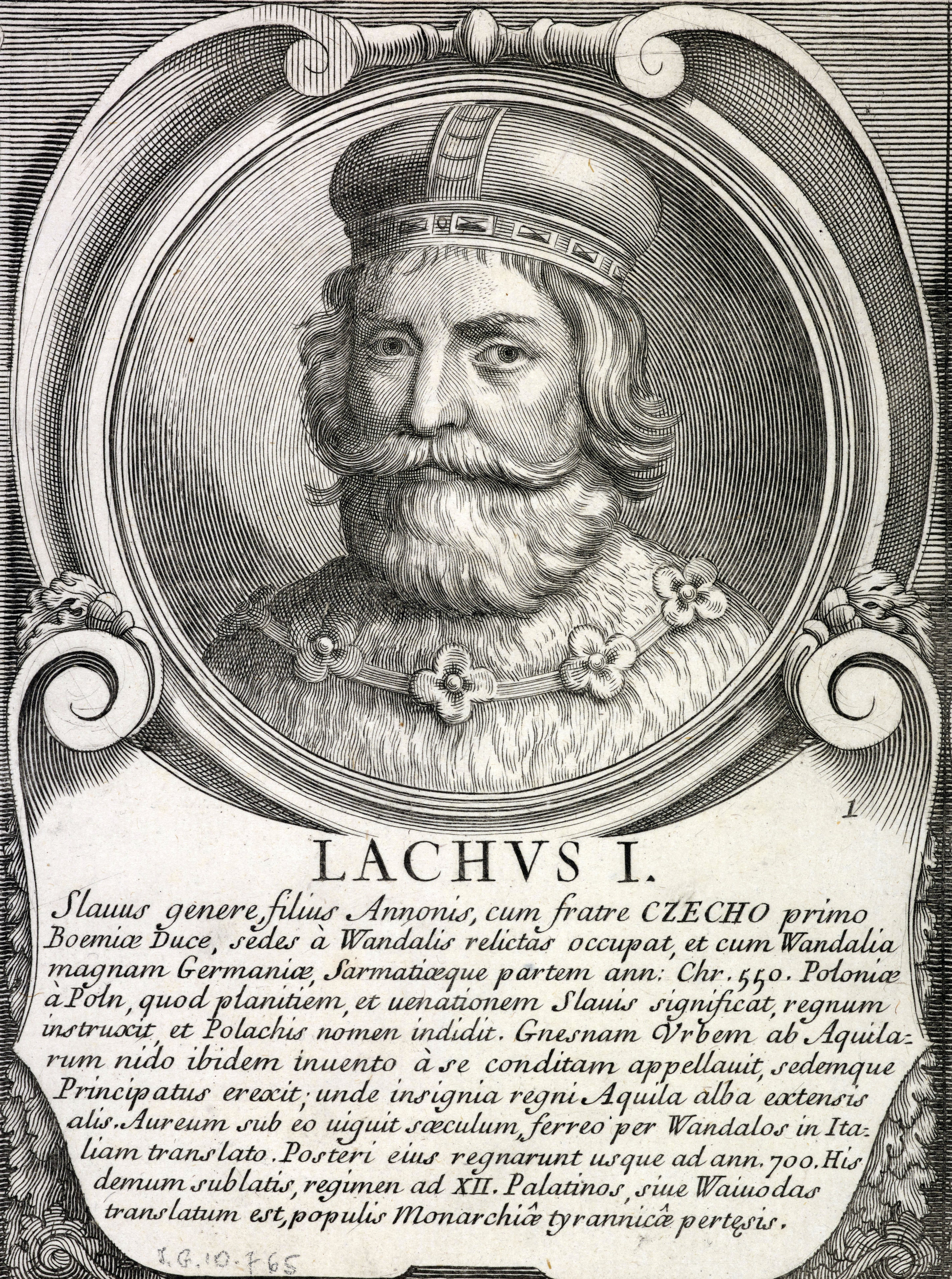
Lech I

The origins of the szlachta, while ancient, have always been considered obscure. As a result, its members often referred to it as odwieczna (perennial). Two popular historical theories about its origins have been put forward by its members and early historians and chroniclers. The first theory involved a presumed descent from the ancient Iranian tribe known as Sarmatians, who in the 2nd century AD, occupied lands in Eastern Europe, and the Middle East. The second theory involved a presumed szlachta descent from Japheth, one of Noah's sons. By contrast, the peasantry were said to be the offspring of another son of Noah, Ham — and hence subject to bondage under the Curse of Ham. The Jews were considered the offspring of Shem. Other fanciful theories included its foundation by Julius Caesar, Alexander the Great, or regional leaders who had not mixed their bloodlines with those of 'slaves, prisoners, or aliens'.

Another theory describes its derivation from a non-Slavic warrior class, forming a distinct element known as the Lechici/Lekhi (Lechitów) within the ancient Polonic tribal groupings (Indo-European caste systems). Similar to Nazi racial ideology, which dictated the Polish elite were largely Nordic (the szlachta Boreyko coat of arms heralds a swastika), this hypothesis states this upper class was not of Slavonic extraction and was of a different origin than the Slavonic peasants (kmiecie; Latin: cmethones) over which they ruled.

In old Poland, there were two nations – szlachta and peasants. The szlachta were differentiated from the rural population. In harshly stratified and elitist Polish society, the szlachta's sense of distinction led to practices that in later periods would be characterized as racism. Wacław Potocki, herbu Śreniawa (1621–1696), proclaimed peasants "by nature" are "chained to the land and plow," that even an educated peasant would always remain a peasant, because "it is impossible to transform a dog into a lynx." The szlachta were noble in the Aryan (see Alans) sense -- "noble" in contrast to the people over whom they ruled after coming into contact with them.

The szlachta traced their descent from Lech/Lekh, who allegedly founded the Polish kingdom in about the fifth century. Lechia was the name of Poland in antiquity, and the szlachta's own name for themselves was Lechici/Lekhi. Richard Holt Hutton argued an exact counterpart of szlachta society was the system of tenure of southern India—an aristocracy of equality—settled as conquerors among a separate race. Some elements of the Polish state paralleled the Roman Empire in that full rights of citizenship were limited to the szlachta. According to British historian Alexander Bruce Boswell, the 16th-century szlachta ideal was a Greek polis—a body of citizens, a small merchant class, and a multitude of laborers. The laborers consisted of peasants in serfdom. The szlachta had the exclusive right to enter the clergy until the time of the three partitions of Poland–Lithuania, and the szlachta and clergy believed they were genetically superior to peasants. The szlachta regarded peasants as a lower species. Quoting Bishop of Poznań, Wawrzyniec Goślicki, herbu Grzymała (between 1530 and 1540–1607):

"The kingdome of Polonia doth also consist of the said three sortes, that is, the king, nobility and people. But it is to be noted, that this word people includeth only knights and gentlemen. ... The gentlemen of Polonia doe represent the popular state, for in them consisteth a great part of the government, and they are as a Seminarie from whence Councellors and Kinges are taken."

===== Military caste and aristocracy =====
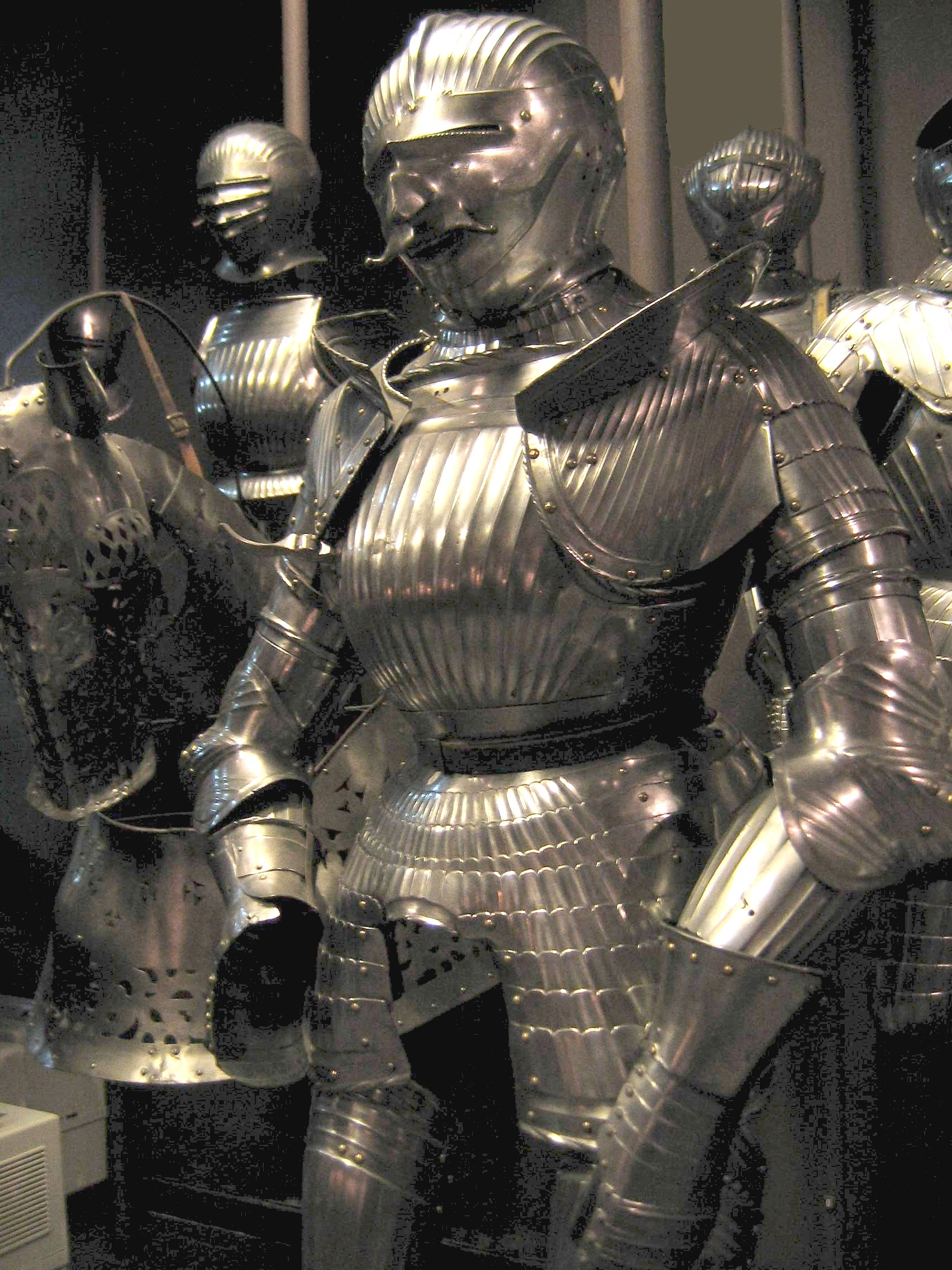
Polish armor from the Battle of Orsha, 1514

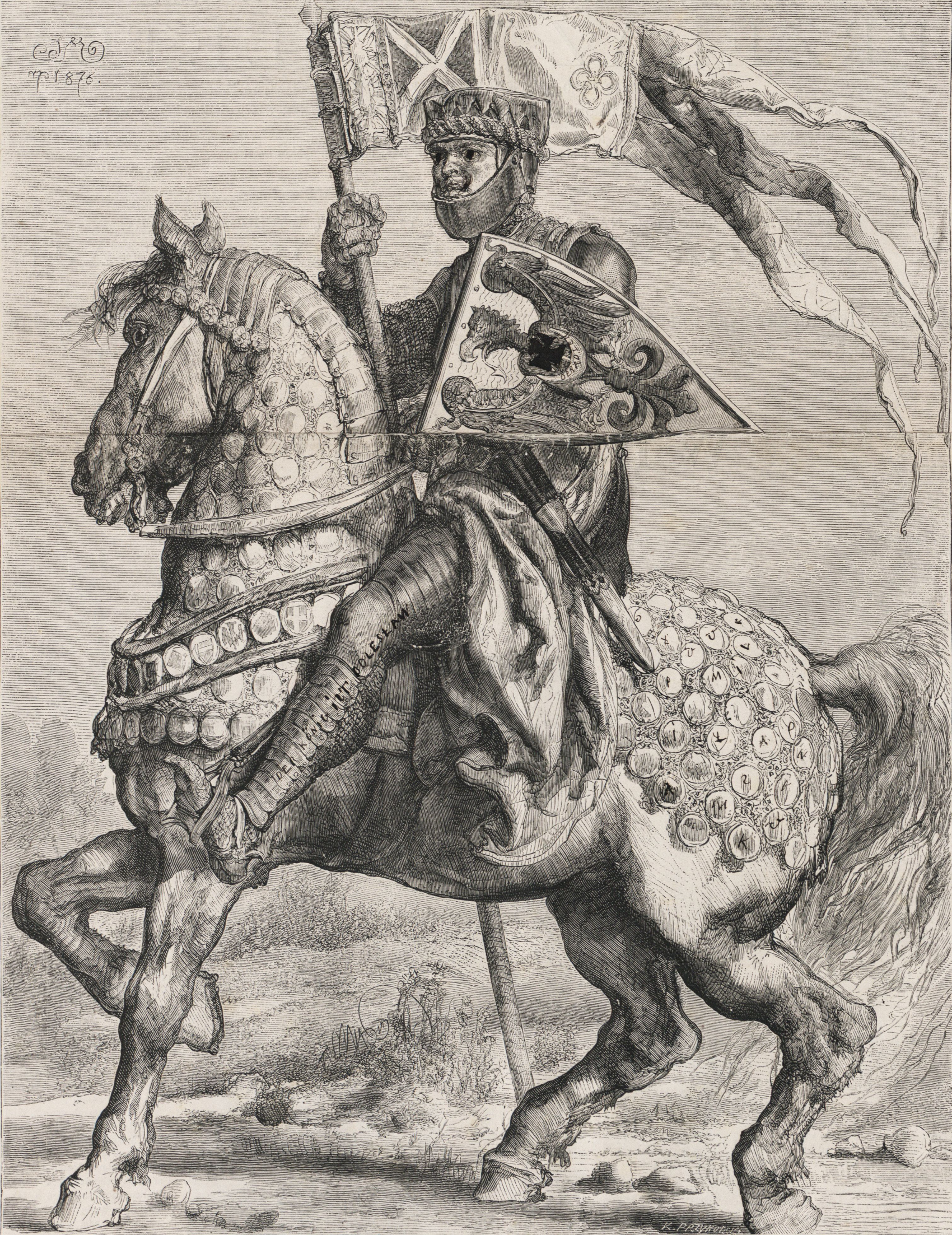
Bolesław I the Tall (1127–1201) with heraldic shield, by Jan Matejko

The social status of szlachta is compared with caste, a military caste, similar to castes in Hindu society. In the year 1244, Bolesław, Duke of Masovia, identified members of the knights' clan as members of a genealogia:

"I received my good servitors [Raciborz and Albert] from the land of [Great] Poland, and from the clan [genealogia] called Jelito, with my well-disposed knowledge [i.e., consent and encouragement] and the cry [vocitatio], [that is], the godło, [by the name of] Nagody, and I established them in the said land of mine, Masovia, [on the military tenure described elsewhere in the charter]."

The documentation regarding Raciborz and Albert's tenure is the earliest surviving of the use of the clan name and cry defining the honorable status of Polish knights. The names of knightly genealogiae only came to be associated with heraldic devices later in the Middle Ages and in the early modern period. The Polish clan name and cry ritualized the ius militare, i.e., the power to command an army; and they had been used sometime before 1244 to define knightly status. (Górecki 1992, pp. 183–185).

"In Poland, the Radwanice were noted relatively early (1274) as the descendants of Radwan, a knight [more properly a "rycerz" from the German "ritter"] active a few decades earlier. ..."

Escutcheons and hereditary coats of arms with eminent privileges attached is an honor derived from the ancient Germans. Where Germans did not inhabit, and where German customs were unknown, no such thing existed. The usage of heraldry in Poland was brought in by knights arriving from Silesia, Lusatia, Meissen, and Bohemia. Migrations from here were the most frequent, and the time period was the thirteenth and fourteenth centuries. However, unlike other European chivalry, coats of arms were associated with Polish knights' clans' (genealogiae) names and war cries (godło), where heraldic devices came to be held in common by entire clans, fighting in regiments. (Górecki 1992, pp. 183–185).

Around the 14th century, there was little difference between knights and the szlachta in Poland. Members of the szlachta had the personal obligation to defend the country (pospolite ruszenie), thereby becoming within the kingdom a military caste and aristocracy with political power and extensive rights secured. Inclusion in the warrior caste was almost exclusively based on inheritance.

Concerning the early Polish tribes, geography contributed to long-standing traditions. The Polish tribes were internalized and organized around a unifying religious cult, governed by the wiec, an assembly of free tribesmen. Later, when safety required power to be consolidated, an elected prince was chosen to govern. The election privilege was usually limited to elites.

The tribes were ruled by clans (ród) consisting of people related by blood or marriage and theoretically descending from a common ancestor, giving the ród/clan a highly developed sense of solidarity. (See gens.) The starosta (or starszyna) had judicial and military power over the ród/clan, although this power was often exercised with an assembly of elders. Strongholds called grόd were built where the religious cult was powerful, where trials were conducted, and where clans gathered in the face of danger. The opole was the territory occupied by a single tribe. (Manteuffel 1982, p. 44) The family unit of a tribe is called the rodzina, while a collection of tribes is a plemię.

Mieszko I of Poland (c. 935 – 25 May 992) established an elite knightly retinue from within his army, which he depended upon for success in uniting the Lekhitic tribes and preserving the unity of his state. Documented proof exists of Mieszko I's successors utilizing such a retinue, as well.

Another group of knights were granted land in allodium, not feudal tenure, by the prince, allowing them the economic ability to serve the prince militarily. A Polish warrior belonging to the military caste living at the time prior to the 15th century was referred to as a "rycerz", very roughly equivalent to the English "knight", the critical difference being the status of "rycerz" was almost strictly hereditary; the group of all such warriors was known as the "rycerstwo". Representing the wealthier families of Poland and itinerant knights from abroad seeking their fortunes, this other group of rycerstwo, which became the szlachta ("szlachta" becomes the proper term for Polish aristocracy beginning about the 15th century), gradually formed apart from Mieszko I's and his successors' elite retinues. This rycerstwo/aristocracy secured more rights granting them favored status. They were absolved from particular burdens and obligations under ducal law, resulting in the belief only rycerstwo (those combining military prowess with high/aristocratic birth) could serve as officials in state administration.

Select rycerstwo were distinguished above the other rycerstwo, because they descended from past tribal dynasties, or because early Piasts' endowments made them select beneficiaries. These rycerstwo of great wealth were called możni ("the powerful ones"). They had the same political status and status in law as the rycerstwo from which they all originated and to which they would return were their wealth lost. (Manteuffel 1982, pp. 148–149)

The Period of Division (1138–1314), which included nearly 200 years of fragmentation and which stemmed from Bolesław III's division of Poland among his sons, was the genesis of the political structure where the powerful landowning szlachta (możni, both ecclesiastical and lay), whose land was in allodium, not feudal tenure, were economically elevated above the rycerstwo they originated from. The prior political structure was one of Polish tribes united into the historic Polish nation under a state ruled by the Piast dynasty, this dynasty appearing circa 850 A.D.

Some możni descending from past tribal dynasties regarded themselves as co-proprietors of Piast realms, even though the Piasts attempted to deprive them of their independence. These możni constantly sought to undermine princely authority. In Gall Anonym's chronicle, there is noted the nobility's alarm when the Palatine Sieciech "elevated those of a lower class over those who were noble born" entrusting them with state offices. (Manteuffel 1982, p. 149)

==== Lithuania ====
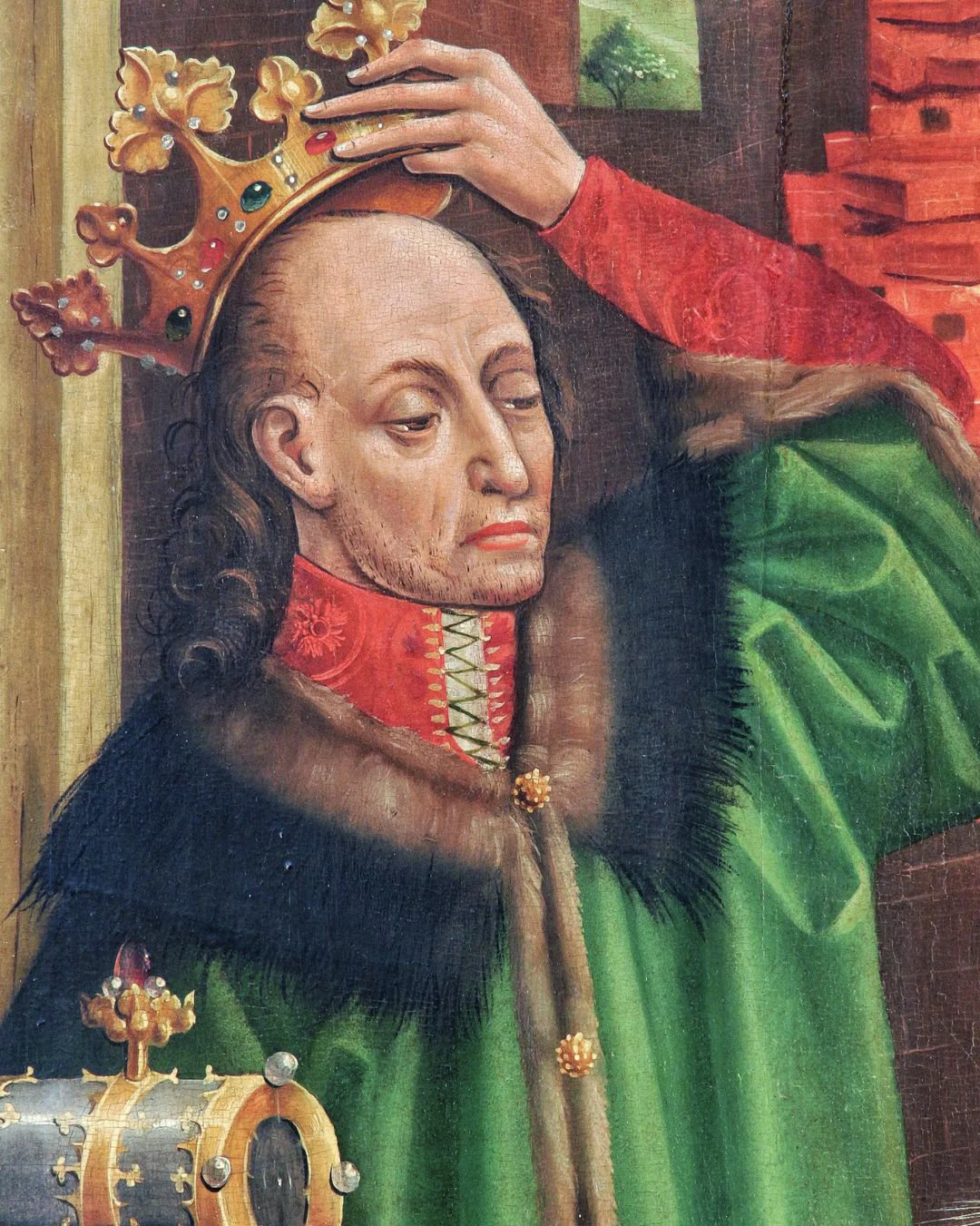
Jogaila (Władysław II)

In Lithuania Propria and in Samogitia, prior to the creation of the Kingdom of Lithuania by Mindaugas, nobles were called die beste leuten in German sources. In Lithuanian, nobles were named ponai. The higher nobility were named kunigai or kunigaikščiai (dukes) — a loanword from Scandinavian konung. They were the established local leaders and warlords. During the development of the state, they gradually became subordinated to higher dukes, and later to the King of Lithuania. Because of Lithuanian expansion into the lands of Ruthenia in the middle of the 14th century, a new term for nobility appeared — bajorai, from Ruthenian бояре - boyars. This word is used to this day in Lithuania to refer to nobility in general, including those from abroad.

After the Union of Horodło, the Lithuanian nobility acquired equal status with its Polish counterparts. Over time they became increasingly Polonized, although they did preserve their national consciousness, and in most cases recognition of their Lithuanian family roots. In the 16th century, some of the Lithuanian nobility claimed that they were descended from the Romans, and that the Lithuanian language was derived from Latin. This led to a conundrum: Polish nobility claimed its own ancestry from Sarmatian tribes, but Sarmatians were considered enemies of the Romans. Thus, a new Roman-Sarmatian theory was created. Strong cultural ties with Polish nobility led to a new term for Lithuanian nobility appearing in the 16th century — šlėkta, a direct loanword from Polish szlachta. Recently, Lithuanian linguists advocated dropping the usage of this Polish loanword.

The process of Polonization took place over a lengthy period. At first only the leading members of the nobility were involved. Gradually the wider population became affected. Major effects on the lesser Lithuanian nobility occurred after various sanctions were imposed by the Russian Empire, such as removing Lithuania from the names of the Gubernyas shortly after the November Uprising. After the January Uprising the sanctions went further, and Russian officials began to intensify Russification, and banned the printing of books in Lithuanian.

==== Ruthenia ====
After the principalities of Halych and Volhynia became integrated with the Grand Duchy, Ruthenia's nobility gradually rendered loyalty to the multilingual and cultural melting pot that was the Grand Duchy of Lithuania. Many noble Ruthenian families intermarried with Lithuanians.

The rights of Orthodox nobles were nominally equal to those enjoyed by the Polish and Lithuanian nobility, but they were put under cultural pressure to convert to Catholicism. It was a policy that was greatly eased in 1596 by the Union of Brest. See, for example, the careers of Senator Adam Kisiel and Jerzy Franciszek Kulczycki.

== Origins of szlachta surnames ==
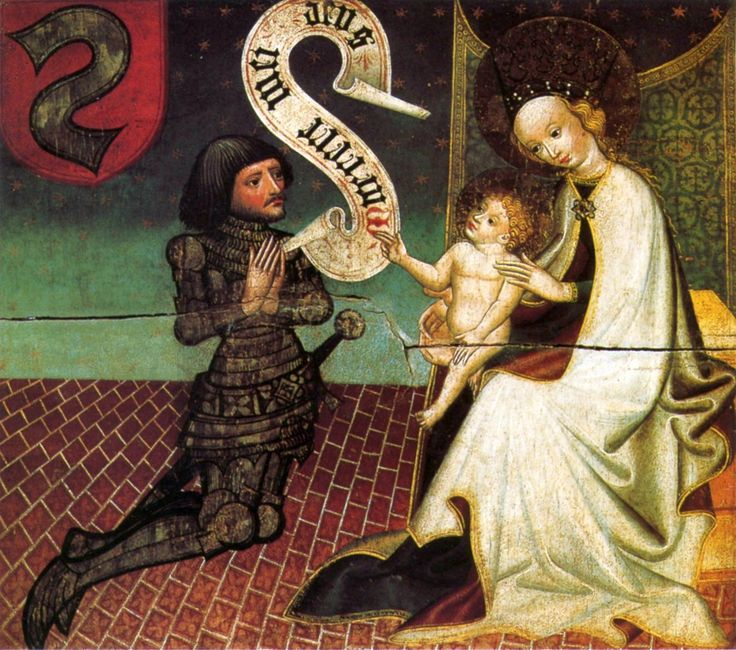
Epitaph of szlachcic Jan of Ujazd sealed with the Srzeniawa coat of arms by unknown artist. It is located at the church of Czchów, Kraków Voivodeship, Lesser Poland province, Crown of the Kingdom of Poland; 1450.

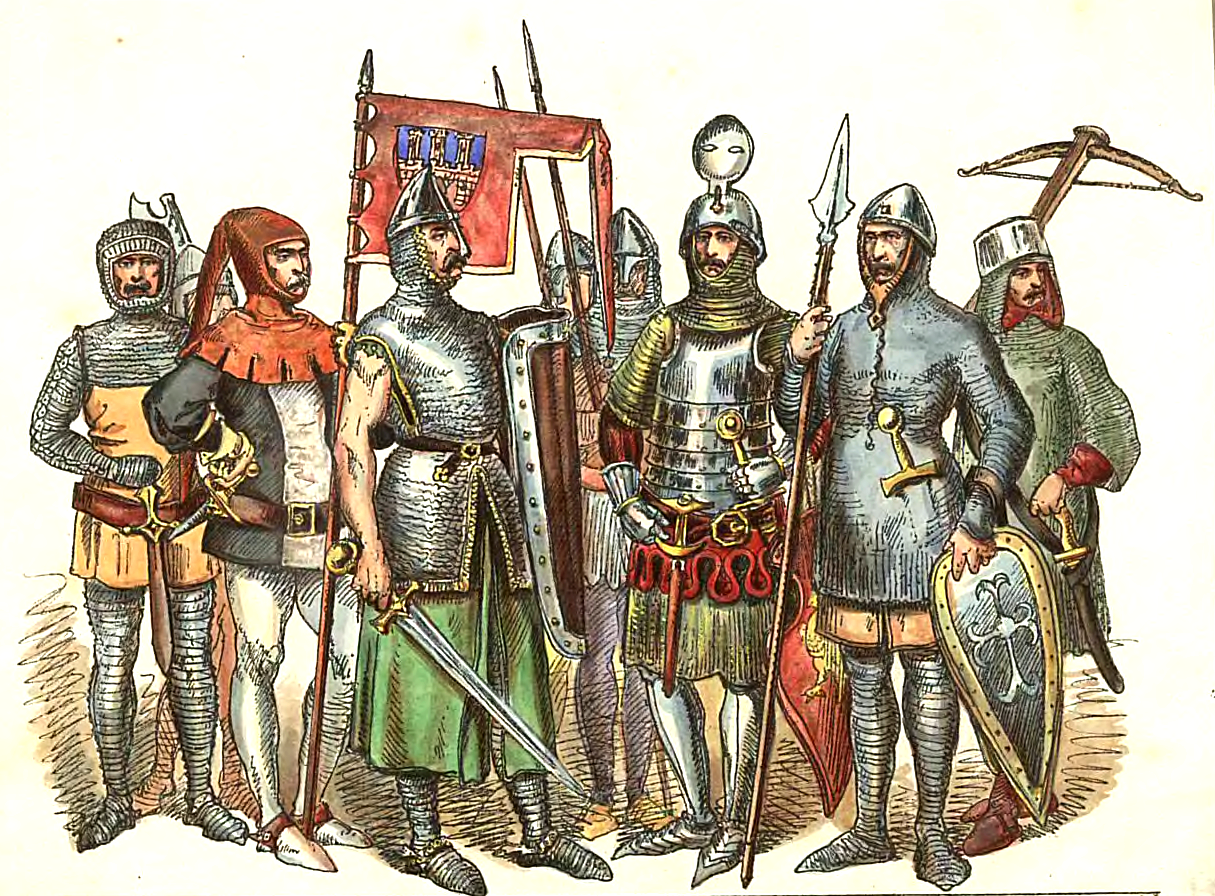
Szlachta 1228–1333

The Proto-Slavic suffix "-ьskъ" means "characteristic of", "typical of". This suffix exists in Polish as "-ski" (feminine: "-ska"). It's attached to surnames derived from a person's occupation, characteristics, patronymic surnames, or toponymic surnames (from a person's place of residence, birth or family origin). In antiquity, the szlachta used topographic surnames to identify themselves. The expression "z" (meaning "from" sometimes "at") plus the name of one's patrimony or estate (dominion) carried the same prestige as "de" in French names such as "de Châtellerault", and "von" or "zu" in German names such as "von Weizsäcker" or "zu Rhein". For example, the family name of counts Litwiccy (Litwicki) was formed with the patronymic suffix -ic from the ethnic name Litwa, i.e. Lithuania, 'nation of Lithuanians'. It refers to the early modern empire of Central Europe, the Polish-Lithuanian Commonwealth (1569–1648). In Polish "z Dąbrówki" and "Dąbrowski" mean the same thing: "of, from Dąbrówka." More precisely, "z Dąbrówki" means owning the patrimony or estate Dąbrówka, not necessarily originating from. Almost all the surnames of genuine Polish szlachta can be traced back to a patrimony or locality, despite time scattering most families far from their original home. John of Zamość called himself John Zamoyski, Stephen of Potok called himself Potocki.

At least since the 16th century the surnames/cognomens of Polish noble families became fixed and were inherited by following generations, remaining in that form until today. Prior to that time, a member of the family would simply use his Christian name (e.g., Jakub, Jan, Mikołaj, etc.), and the name of the coat of arms common to all members of his clan. A member of the family would be identified as, for example, "Jakub z Dąbrówki", herbu Radwan, (Jacob to/at Dąbrówki of the knights' House Radwan coat of arms), or "Jakub z Dąbrówki, Żądło (cognomen) (later a przydomek/nickname/agnomen), herbu Radwan" (Jacob to/at [owning] Dąbrówki with the distinguishing name Żądło of the knights' house Radwan coat of arms), or "Jakub Żądło, herbu Radwan".

The Polish state paralleled the Roman Empire in that full rights of citizenship were limited to the nobles. The nobles in Poland were well educated widely spoke Latin, as Latin was then the language of the Christianity and the Catholic Church and the international language widely spoken by the European elites,, used the Roman naming convention of the tria nomina (praenomen, nomen, and cognomen) to distinguish Polish nobility -citizens from the peasantry and foreigners, hence why multiple surnames are associated with many Polish coat of arms.

Example – Jakub: Radwan Żądło-Dąbrowski (sometimes Jakub: Radwan Dąbrowski-Żądło)

Praenomen

Jan

Nomen (nomen gentile—name of the gens/ród or knights' noble house):

Radwan

Cognomen (name of the family branch within the Radwan ród/noble house):

For example—Braniecki, Dąbrowski, Czcikowski, Dostojewski, Górski, Nicki, Zebrzydowski, etc.

Agnomen (nickname, Polish przydomek):

Żądło (prior to the 17th century, was a cognomen)

Bartosz Paprocki gives an example of the Rościszewski family taking different surnames from the names of various patrimonies or estates they owned. The branch of the Rościszewski family that settled in Chrapunia became the Chrapunski family, the branch of the Rościszewski family that settled in Strykwina became the Strykwinski family, and the branch of the Rościszewski family that settled in Borkow became known as the Borkowski family. Each family shared a common ancestor and belonged to the same noble ród/house, so they bore the same coat of arms as the Rościszewski family.

Each knights' noble house/ród had its coat of arms, and there were only a limited number. Each coat of arms bore a name, the ród/house call word zawołanie (battle cry). In most instances, the coat of arms belonged to many families within the noble houses/rody (singular: ród), but there were also herby własne (personal coat of arms). Polish nobility had a different structure in law than Western Europe's feudal nobility. The noble house/ród system existed throughout the whole of Polish history.

=== Heraldry ===
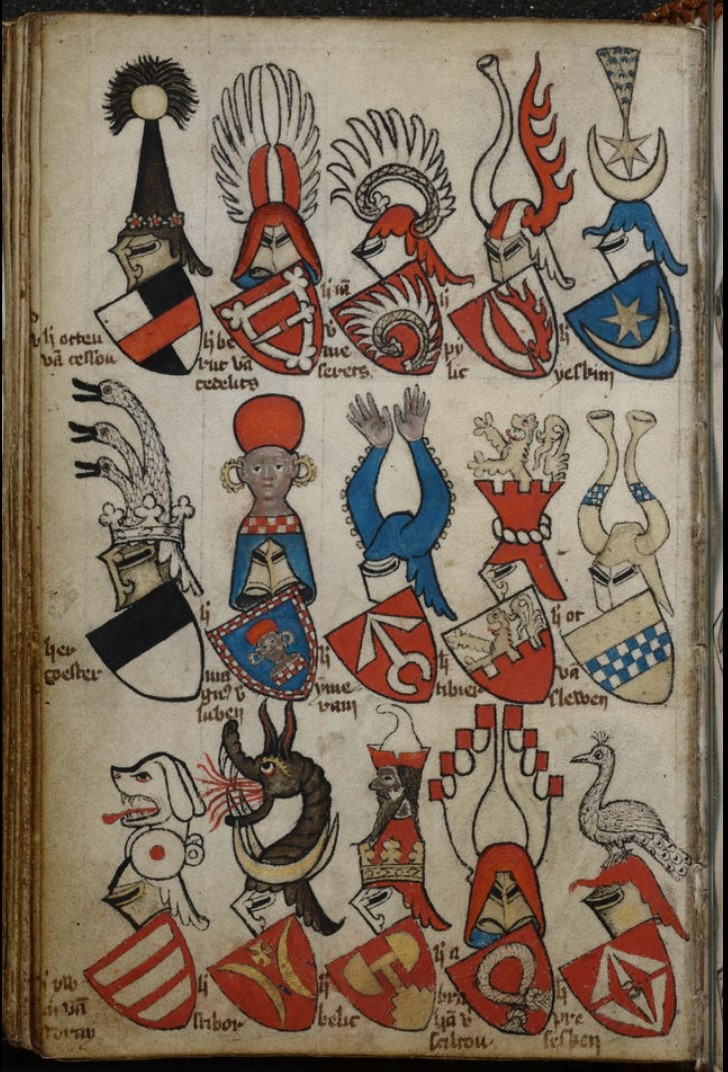
Polish coats of arms in the Gelre Armorial (compiled before 1396), among them Leliwa coat of arms, Ogończyk coat of arms, Ostoja coat of arms (Ostoja knights' clan), Nałęcz coat of arms.

Coats of arms were very important to the Polish nobility. Its heraldic system evolved together with neighbouring states in Central Europe, while differing in many ways from the heraldry of other European countries. Polish Knighthood had its counterparts, links and roots in Bohemia, e.g. Poraj coat of arms and in the lands of what is now Germany, e.g. Junosza coat of arms.

Families who had a common origin would also share a coat of arms. They would also share their crest with families adopted into the ród. Sometimes unrelated families would be attributed to a ród on the basis of similarity of crests. The number of coats of arms in this system was comparatively low and did not exceed 200 in the late Middle Ages. There were 40,000 in the late 18th century.

At the Union of Horodło, forty-seven families of Catholic Lithuanian lords and boyars were adopted by Polish noble families and allowed to use Polish coats of arms.

==== Heritability ====
The tradition of differentiating between a coat of arms and a lozenge granted to women, did not develop in Poland. By the 17th century, invariably, men and women inherited a coat of arms from their father. When mixed marriages developed after the partitions, that is between commoners and members of the nobility, as a courtesy, children could claim a coat of arms from their distaff side, but this was only tolerated and could not be passed on to the next generation. The brisure was rarely used. All children would inherit the coat of arms and title of their father. This partly accounts for the large proportion of Polish families who had claim to a coat of arms by the 18th century. Another factor was the arrival of titled foreign settlers, especially from the lands of the Habsburg Empire. Poland has the largest percentage of nobility in Europe. It was also the largest and the most powerful country in Europe in the XV-XVIc. Polish noble rody/houses were the socio-political-legal entities that created a unique style of governance in the world. Polish noble rody were not clans. Polish nobility created a very unique and specific political style unique to Poland (including all previous lands of the Polish-Lithuanian Commonwealth). Polish noble was legally a noble-citizen, enjoying personal freedoms, religious tolerance, election of the kings, Golden Liberty, Noble Democracy, Neminen Captivabimus law and many other democratic laws unknown anywhere in Europe and the world in those times. In fact Poland was way ahead of its time and its political democratic system later spread to the rest of Europe and the world as many of the modern democratic laws and principles we know now originated or were created in Poland. Polish noble were electing their kings from among themselves, Polish nobles were equal to any European kings. This unique highly democratic Polish political styles derives from the ancient pre-Christian Lechitic wiec (plural:wiece) the early parlamentarism were the circle of the great Lechitic rody gathered at the wiec gathering to elect a prince/head from among themselves by consensus the first among the equals, this later, in the Medieval periods evolved into the knightly houses, and later into the Polish nobility. This ancient tradition of great respect and consensus among the Polish nobles created that very unique political system in Poland. Polish nobility enjoyed the equal status based on greatest mutual respect, law, consensus, dignity, personal freedoms, justice and liberty this is why Poland never had and never allowed any oppressive, absolutist monarchies of system based on some fraudulent “God-given” rights. Polish political system was always based on law, where law was above all the people, even the King in Poland had to obey the law. No human could ever be above the law in the Polish political system. This is why Polish people have always had and have the absolute obsession of protecting the law and freedom, justice and human dignity from whatever oppressive. autocratic system and they always had the strict uncompromising stance towards defending and protecting freedom of their own and that of other nations (The famous Polish motto: „For our freedom and yours”). Polish kings were never absolutist autocrats/absolutist monarchs, but the democratically elected monarchs (the first among the equals).

Illegitimate children of the Polish nobles could adopt the mother's surname and title by the consent of the mother's father, but would sometimes be adopted and raised by the natural father's family, thereby acquiring the father's surname, though not the title or arms.

== Ennoblement ==
=== Kingdom of Poland ===
The number of lawfully granted ennoblements (naturalization) after the 15th century was minimal.

In the Kingdom of Poland and later in the Polish–Lithuanian Commonwealth, ennoblement (nobilitacja) may be equated with an individual given legal status as a szlachcic member of the Polish nobility. Initially, this privilege could be granted by the monarch, but from 1641 onward, this right was reserved for the sejm. Most often the individual being ennobled would join an existing noble family and assume the undifferentiated coat of arms of that noble family/ród/house.

According to heraldic sources, the total number of lawful ennoblements issued between the 14th century and the mid-18th century is estimated at 800. This is an average of only about two ennoblements per year, or only 0.000,000,14 – 0.000,001 of the historical population. Compare: historical demography of Poland. Charles-Joseph, 7th Prince of Ligne, when trying to obtain Polish noble status, supposedly said in 1784, "It is easier to become a duke in Germany, than to be counted among Polish nobles."

The close of the late 18th century (see below) was a period in which a definite increase in the number of ennoblements can be noted. This can most readily be explained in terms of the ongoing decline and eventual collapse of the Commonwealth and the resulting need for soldiers and other military leaders (see: Partitions of Poland, King Stanisław August Poniatowski).

==== Estimated number of ennoblements ====
According to heraldic sources 1,600 is the total estimated number of all lawful ennoblements throughout the history of Kingdom of Poland and Polish–Lithuanian Commonwealth from the 14th century onward (half of which were performed in the final years of the late 18th century).

Types of ennoblement:

- Adopcja herbowa – The "old way" of ennoblement, popular in the 14th century, connected with adoption into an existing noble family/ród by an act of the king. The king granted a fragment of his own coat of arms establishing an alliance with the king's family, or a knight performed an adoption under their coat of arms, which required the confirmation of the king. This form of ennoblement was abolished in the 17th century.
- Skartabellat – Introduced by pacta conventa of the 17th century (since 1669), this was ennoblement into a sort of "conditional" or "graduated nobility" status. Skartabels could not hold public offices or be members of the Sejm, but after three generations, the descendants of these families would "mature" to full noble status. In 1775 another requirement was imposed – they had to acquire a landed estate.
- Indygenat – from the Latin expression, indigenatus, recognition of foreign noble status. A foreign noble, after acquiring indygenat status, received all privileges of a Polish noble.. In Polish history, 413 foreign noble families were recognized. Prior to the 17th century this was done by the King and Sejm, after the 17th century it was done only by the Sejm.
- Herb własny, personal coat of arms the king granted a personal coat of arms, a heraldic design belonging to only one specific family, or person through a procedure known as nobilitacja (ennoblement) to for example non-nobles for some outstanding deeds, achievements etc. It belonged strictly to the ennobled individual and their direct, legitimate descendants. The privilege had to be formally registered. The privilege had to be formally entered into the court registers.registers.
- "secret ennoblement" – This was of questionable legal status and was often not recognized by many nobles. It was typically granted by the elected monarch without the required legal approval of the Sejm.

=== Grand Duchy of Lithuania ===
In the late 14th century, in the Grand Duchy of Lithuania, Vytautas the Great reformed the Grand Duchy's army: instead of calling all men to arms, he created forces comprising professional warriors—bajorai ("nobles"; see the cognate "boyar"). As there were not enough nobles, Vytautas trained suitable men, relieving them of labor on the land and of other duties; for their military service to the Grand Duke, they were granted land that was worked by hired men (veldams). The newly formed noble families generally took up, as their family names, the Lithuanian pagan given names of their ennobled ancestors; this was the case with the Goštautai, Radvilos, Astikai, Kęsgailos and others. These families were granted their coats of arms under the Union of Horodlo (1413).

In 1506, King Sigismund I the Old confirmed the position of the Lithuanian Council of Lords in state politics and limited entry into the nobility.

== Privileges ==
Specific rights of the szlachta included:

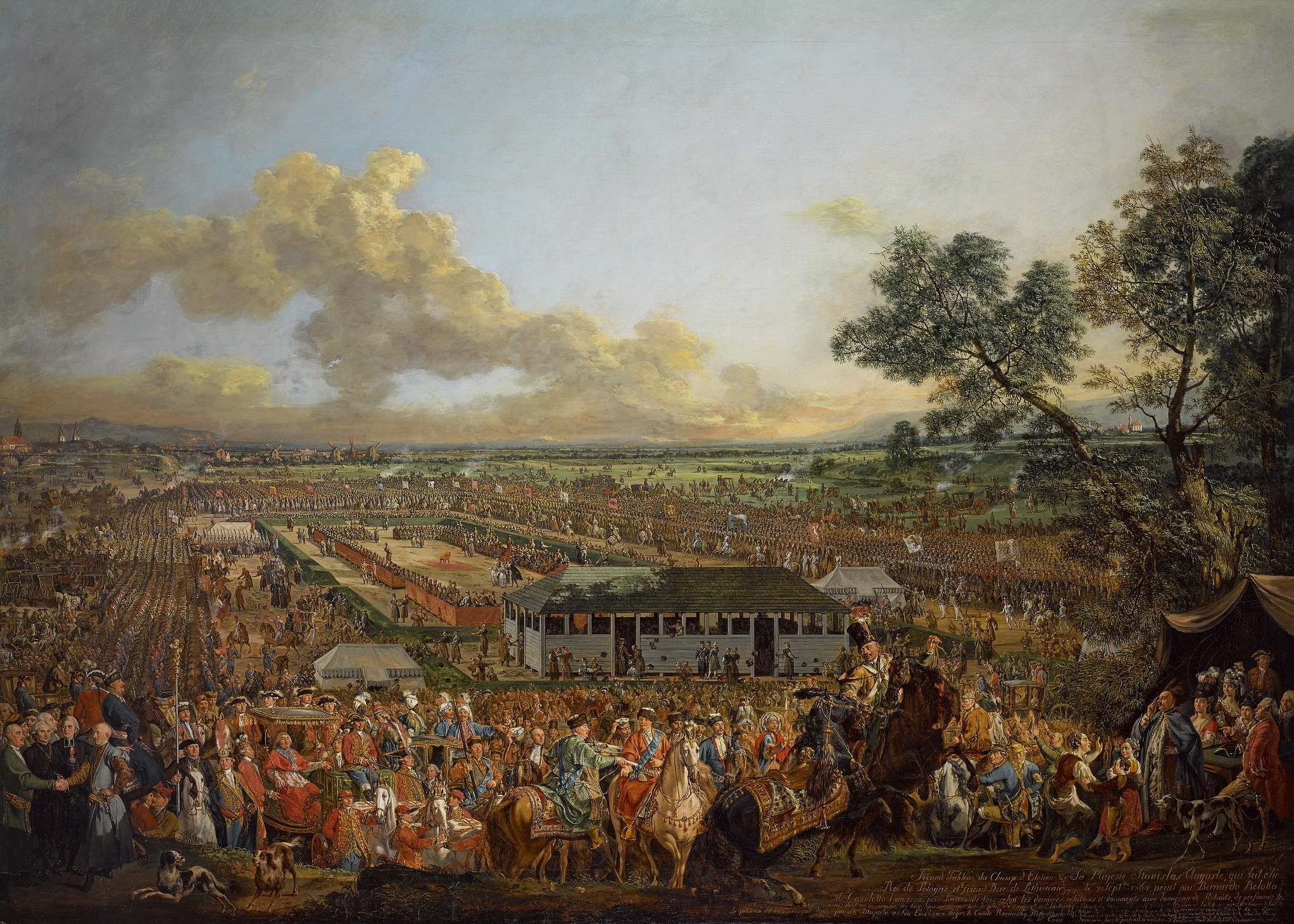
The Election of Stanisław August

1. The right to hold outright ownership of land (Allod)—not as a fief, conditional upon service to the liege Lord, but absolutely in perpetuity unless sold. The szlachta had a monopoly on land. Peasants did not own land. See Polish landed gentry (Ziemiaństwo).
2. The right to join in political and military assemblies of the regional nobility.
3. The right to form independent administrative councils for their locality.
4. The right to cast a vote for Polish Kings.
5. The right to travel freely anywhere in the old Commonwealth of the Polish and Lithuanian nobility; or outside it, as foreign policy dictated.
6. The right to demand information from Crown offices.
7. The right to spiritual semi-independence from the clergy.
8. The right to interdict, in suitable ways, the passage of foreigners and townsmen through their territories.
9. The right of priority over the courts of the peasantry.
10. Special rights in Polish courts, including freedom from arbitrary arrest and freedom from corporal punishment.
11. The right to sell their military or administrative services.
12. Heraldic rights.
13. The right to receive higher pay when involved in the "pospolite ruszenie" (mobilization of all population for defense of the nation).
14. Educational rights
15. The right of importing duty-free goods often.
16. The exclusive right to enter the clergy until the time of the three partitions of Poland.
17. The right to try their peasants for major offences (reduced to minor offences only, after the 1760s).

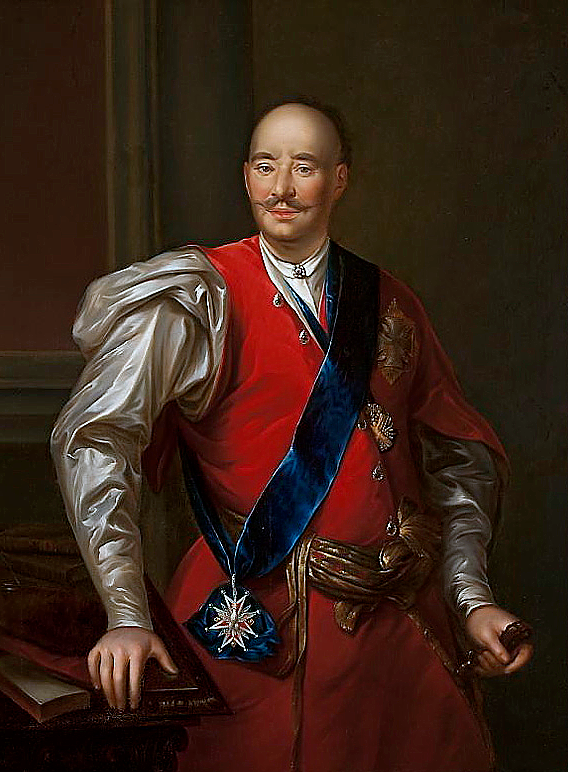
Franciszek Salezy Potocki, wearing the Order of the White Eagle.

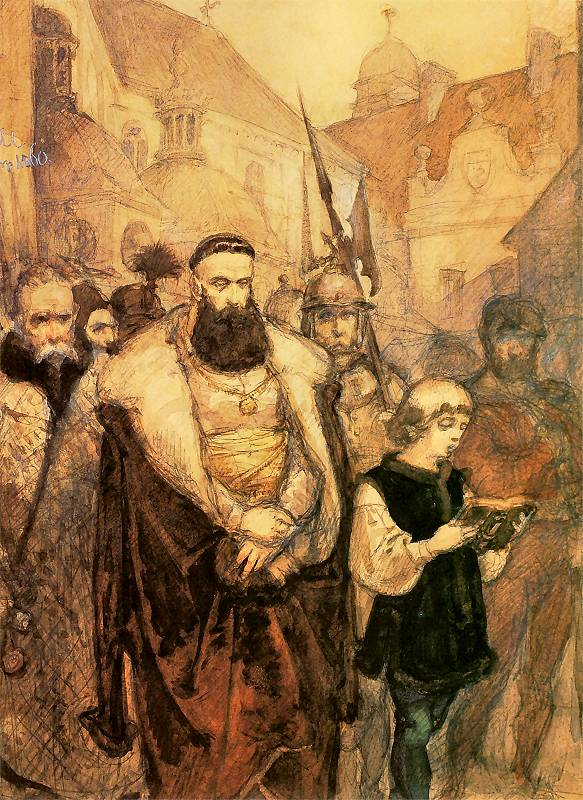
Samuel Zborowski on his way to his execution, 26 May 1584. Sketch by Jan Matejko, 1860

Significant legislative changes in the status of the szlachta, as defined by Robert Bideleux and Ian Jeffries, consist of its 1374 exemption from the land tax, a 1425 guarantee against the 'arbitrary arrests and/or seizure of property' of its members, a 1454 requirement that military forces and new taxes be approved by provincial Sejms, and statutes issued between 1496 and 1611 that prescribed the rights of commoners.

=== Real and false nobles ===
Nobles were born into a noble family, or adopted into a noble clan by an act of the King (this was abolished in 1633). The rarest way of achieving szlachta status was through ennoblement (naturalization) by a king or Sejm for reasons such as bravery in combat, service to the state, etc. There were claims some nobles were, in fact, usurpers who were commoners that moved to another part of the country and falsely claimed noble status. In the first half of the 16th century, hundreds of such "false nobles" were denounced by Hieronim Nekanda Trepka (1550–1630) in his "Liber generationis plebeanorum (Liber chamorum)", or "Book of Plebeian Genealogy (Ham's Book)". Peasants were considered descendants of Ham, the son of Noah subject to bondage under the Curse of Ham. The law forbade commoners holding landed estates and promised such estates as a reward to denouncers. Trepka was himself an impoverished nobleman who lived a town dweller's life and documented hundreds of such false claims hoping to take over one of the usurped estates. He does not seem to have succeeded in his quest despite his employment as the king's secretary. Many sejms issued decrees over the centuries in an attempt to resolve this issue, but with little success. It is unknown what percentage of the Polish nobility came from the 'lower orders' of society, but there are historians who claim nobles of such base origins formed a 'significant' element of the szlachta.

Self-promotion and aggrandizement were not confined to commoners. Often, members of the lower szlachta sought further ennoblement from foreign, therefore less verifiable, sources. That is, they might acquire by legitimate means or otherwise, such as by purchase, one of a selection of foreign titles ranging from Baron, Marchese, Freiherr to Comte, all readily translatable into the Polish Hrabia. Alternatively, they would simply appropriate a title by conferring it upon themselves. An example of this is cited in the case of the last descendant of the Ciechanowiecki family, who managed to restore a genuinely old Comital title, but whose actual origins are shrouded in 18th-century mystery.

=== Accretion of sovereignty to the szlachta ===
The szlachta secured many rights not secured to the nobility of other countries. Over time, each new monarch ceded to them further privileges. Those privileges became the basis of the Golden Liberty in the Polish–Lithuanian Commonwealth. Despite having a king, Poland was considered the 'nobility's Commonwealth' because Royal elections in Poland were in the hands of members of a hereditary class. Poland was therefore the domain of this class, and not that of the king or the ruling dynasty. This arose in part because of the extinction of male heirs in the original royal dynasties: first, the Piasts, then the Jagiellons. As a result, the nobility took it upon itself to choose "the Polish king" from among the dynasties' matrilineal descendants.

Poland's successive kings granted privileges to the nobility upon their election to the throne – the privileges having been specified in the king-elect's Pacta conventa – and at other times, in exchange for ad hoc leave to raise an extraordinary tax or a pospolite ruszenie, a military call up. Poland's nobility thus accumulated a growing array of privileges and immunities.

In 1355 in Buda King Casimir III the Great issued the first country-wide privilege for the nobility, in exchange for their agreeing that if Casimir had no male heirs, the throne would pass to his nephew, Louis I of Hungary. Casimir further decreed that the nobility would no longer be subject to 'extraordinary' taxes or have to use their own funds for foreign military expeditions. Casimir also promised that when the royal court toured, the king and the court would cover all expenses, instead of requiring facilities to be provided by the local nobility.

==== Privilege of Koszyce and others ====
In 1374 King Louis of Hungary approved the Privilege of Koszyce (przywilej koszycki) to guarantee the Polish throne for his daughter, Jadwiga. He broadened the definition of membership of the nobility and exempted the entire class from all but one tax (łanowy) a limit of 2 groszes per łan of land, Old Polish units of measurement. In addition, the King's right to raise taxes was effectively abolished: no new taxes would be levied without the agreement of the nobility. Henceforth, district offices were also reserved exclusively for local nobility, as the Privilege of Koszyce forbade the king to grant official posts and major Polish castles to foreign knights. Finally, the privilege obliged the king to pay indemnities to nobles injured or taken captive during a war outside Polish borders.

In 1422 King Władysław II Jagiełło was constrained by the Privilege of Czerwińsk (przywilej czerwiński), which established the inviolability of nobles' property. Their estates could not be confiscated except upon the verdict of a court. It also made him cede some jurisdiction over fiscal policy to the Royal Council, later, the Senate of Poland, including the right to mint coinage.

In 1430, with the Privileges of Jedlnia, confirmed at Kraków in 1433, Polish: przywileje jedlneńsko-krakowskie, based partially on his earlier Brześć Kujawski privilege (25 April 1425), King Władysław II Jagiełło granted the nobility a guarantee against arbitrary arrest, similar to the English Magna Carta's habeas corpus, known from its own Latin name as "neminem captivabimus nisi jure victum". Henceforth, no member of the nobility could be imprisoned without a warrant from a court of justice. The king could neither punish nor imprison any noble on a whim. King Władysław's quid pro quo for the easement was the nobles' guarantee that the throne would be inherited by one of his sons, who would be bound to honour the privileges granted earlier to the nobility. On 2 May 1447 the same king issued the Wilno Pact, or Wilno Privilege, which gave the Lithuanian boyars the same rights as those already secured by the Polish szlachta.

In 1454, King Casimir IV granted the Nieszawa Statutes – Polish: statuty cerkwicko-nieszawskie, clarifying the legal basis of voivodship sejmiks – local parliaments. The king could promulgate new laws, raise taxes, or call for a mass military call up pospolite ruszenie, only with the consent of the sejmiks, and the nobility were protected from judicial abuses. The Nieszawa Statutes also curbed the power of the magnates, as the Sejm, the national parliament, had the right to elect many officials, including judges, voivods and castellans. These privileges were demanded by the szlachta in exchange for their participation in the Thirteen Years' War.

==== First Royal Election ====
The first "free election" (Polish: wolna elekcja) of a king took place in 1492. In fact, some earlier Polish kings had been elected with help from assemblies such as those that put Casimir II on the throne, thereby setting a precedent for free elections. Only senators voted in the 1492 free election, which was won by John I Albert. For the duration of the Jagiellonian Dynasty, only members of that royal family were considered for election. Later, there would be no restrictions on the choice of candidates.

In 1493 the Sejm, began meeting every two years at Piotrków. It comprised two chambers:

- a Senate of 81 bishops and other dignitaries
- a Chamber of Deputies of 54 deputies representing their respective domains.

The numbers of senators and deputies later increased.

On 26 April 1496 King John I Albert granted the Privilege of Piotrków. The Statutes of Piotrków increased the nobility's feudal power over serfs. It bound the peasant to the land, and only one son though not the eldest, was permitted to leave the village. Townsfolk mieszczaństwo were prohibited from owning land. Positions in the Church hierarchy were restricted to nobles.

On 23 October 1501, the Polish–Lithuanian union was reformed by the Union of Mielnik. It was there that the tradition of a coronation Sejm was founded. Here again, the lesser nobility, lesser in wealth only – not in rank – attempted to reduce the power of the Magnates with a law that made them impeachable before the Senate for malfeasance. However, the Act of Mielnik of 25 October did more to strengthen the Magnate-dominated Senate of Poland than the lesser nobility. Nobles as a whole were given the right to disobey the King or his representatives — non praestanda oboedientia, and to form confederations, armed opposition against the king or state officials if the nobles found that the law or their legitimate privileges were being infringed.

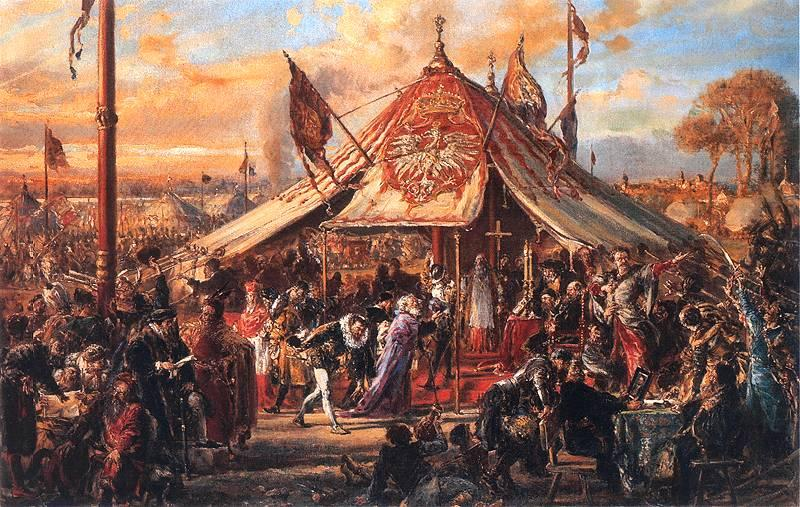
The Commonwealth's Power at Its Zenith, Golden Liberty, the Election of 1573. Painting by Jan Matejko

On 3 May 1505 King Alexander I Jagiellon granted the Act of Nihil novi nisi commune consensu – "I accept nothing new except by common consent". This forbade the king to pass new laws without the consent of the representatives of the nobility in the assembled Sejm, thus greatly strengthening the nobility's powers. Essentially, this act marked the transfer of legislative power from the king to the Sejm. It also marks the beginning of the First Rzeczpospolita, the period of a szlachta-run "Commonwealth".

In 1520 the Act of Bydgoszcz granted the Sejm the right to convene every four years, with or without the king's permission. At about that time the Executionist Movement, seeking to oversee law enforcement, began to take shape. Its members sought to curb the power of the Magnates at the Sejm and to strengthen the power of the monarch. In 1562 at the Sejm in Piotrków they forced the Magnates to return many leased crown lands to the king, and the king to create a standing army wojsko kwarciane. One of the most famous members of this movement was Jan Zamoyski.

==== End of the Jagiellonian dynasty ====
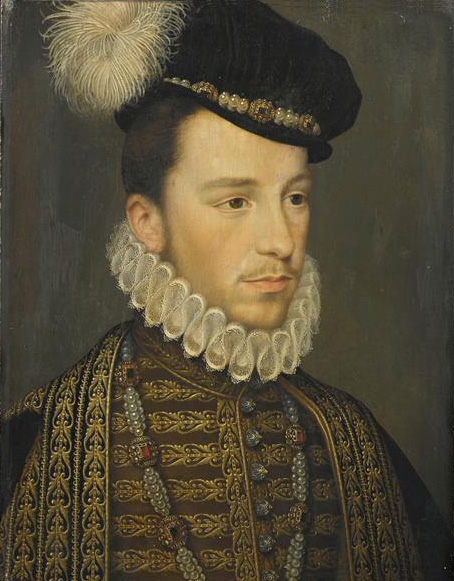
Henry of Valois, first elected monarch of Poland-Lithuania

Until the death of Sigismund II Augustus, the last king of the Jagiellonian dynasty, all monarchs had to be elected from within the royal family. However, from 1573, practically any Polish noble or foreigner of royal blood could potentially become a Polish–Lithuanian monarch. Every newly elected king was supposed to sign two documents: the Pacta conventa, the king's "pre-election pact", and the Henrican articles, named after the first freely elected king, Henry of Valois. The latter document was a virtual Polish constitution and contained the basic laws of the Commonwealth:

- Free election of kings
- Religious tolerance
- The Sejm to meet every two years
- Foreign policy controlled by the Sejm
- A royal advisory council chosen by the Sejm
- Official posts restricted to Polish and Lithuanian nobles
- Taxes and monopolies set up by the Sejm only
- Nobles' right to disobey the Monarch should s/he break any of these laws.

In 1578 king, Stefan Batory, created the Crown Tribunal to reduce the enormous pressure on the Royal Court. This placed much of the monarch's juridical power in the hands of the elected szlachta deputies, further strengthening the nobility as a class. In 1581 the Crown Tribunal was joined by a counterpart in Lithuania, the Lithuanian Tribunal.

=== Magnate oligarchy ===
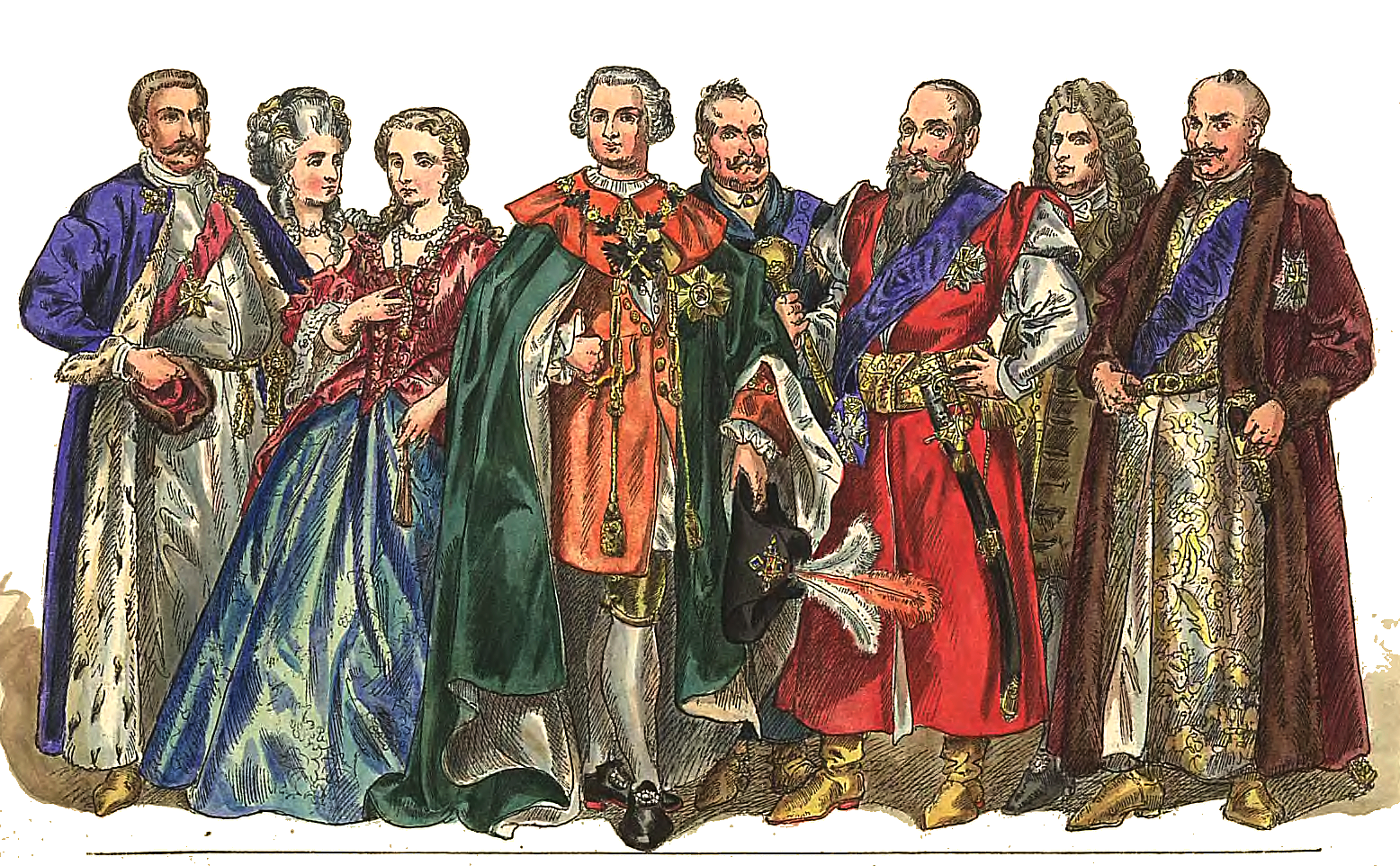
Magnates of Poland and Lithuania. Drawing by Jan Matejko, circa 1893

For many centuries, wealthy and powerful members of the szlachta sought to gain legal privileges over their peers. In 1459 Ostroróg presented a memorandum to the Sejm (parliament), submitting palatines, or Voivodes of the Polish–Lithuanian Commonwealth, receive the title of prince. Sons of the prince were to receive titles of counts and barons. Castellans of the Polish–Lithuanian Commonwealth were to receive the title of count. All these submissions were rejected.

Few szlachta were wealthy enough to be known as Magnates, karmazyni, the "Crimsons" – from the crimson colour of their boots. A true Magnate had to be able to trace his ancestry for many generations and own at least 20 villages or estates. He also had to hold high office in the Commonwealth.. Thus, out of about one million szlachta, only 200–300 persons could be classed as Magnates with country-wide possessions and influence. Of these some 30–40 were considered as having significant impact on Poland's politics. Magnates often received gifts from monarchs, which greatly increased their wealth. Although such gifts were only temporary leases, often the Magnates never returned them. This gave rise in the 16th century, to a self-policing trend by the szlachta, known as the ruch egzekucji praw — movement for the enforcement of the law – against usurping Magnates to force them to return leased lands back to their rightful owner, the monarch.

One of the most important victories of the Magnates was the late 16th century right to create Ordynacjas, similar to Fee tails under English law, which ensured that a family which gained landed wealth could more easily preserve it. The Ordynacjas that belonged to families such as the Radziwiłł, Zamoyski, Potocki or Lubomirskis often rivalled the estates of the king and were important power bases for them.

The difference between the magnateria and the rest of the szlachta was primarily one of wealth and life-style, as both belonged to the same legally defined class being members of the same clans. Consequently, any power wrested from the king by the magnates was consequently trickled down to the entirety of the szlachta. This often meant the rest of the szlachta tended to cooperate with the magnates rather than struggle against them.

=== Szlachta loss of influence ===
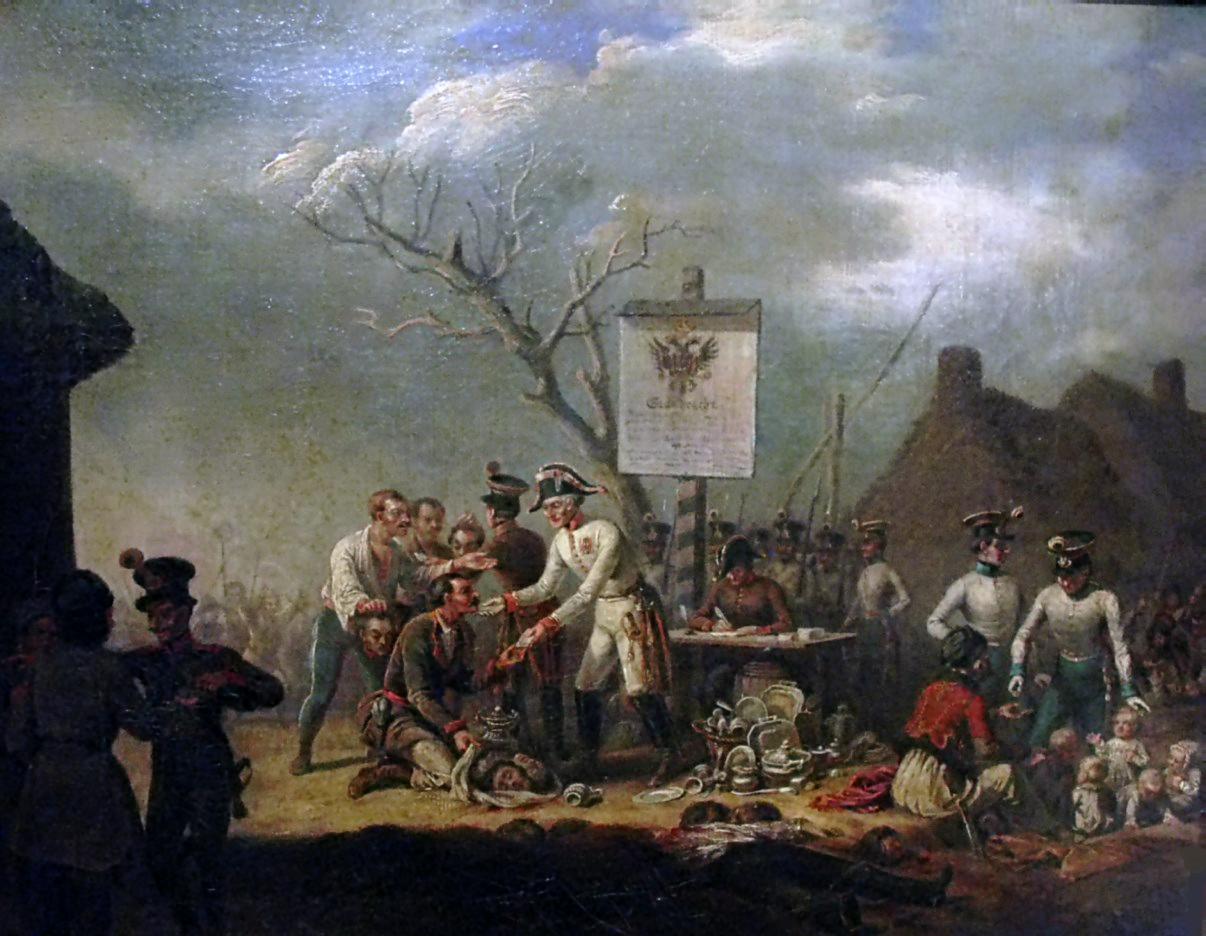
The Peasant Uprising of 1846, the largest peasant uprising against szlachta rulership on Polish lands in the 19th century.

The notion of the szlachta's accrued sovereignty ended in 1795 with the final Partitions of Poland, and until 1918 their legal status was dependent on the policies of the Russian Empire, the Kingdom of Prussia or the Habsburg monarchy.

In the 1840s Nicholas I reduced 64,000 of lesser szlachta to a particular commoner status known as odnodvortsy (literally "single-householders"). Despite this, 62.8% of all Russia's nobles were Polish szlachta in 1858 and still 46.1% in 1897. Serfdom was abolished in Russian Poland on 19 February 1864. It was deliberately enacted with the aim of ruining the szlachta. Only in the Russian Partition did peasants pay the market price for land redemption, the average for the rest of the Russian Empire was 34% above the market rates. All land taken from Polish peasants since 1846 was to be returned to them without redemption payments. The ex-serfs could only sell land to other peasants, not szlachta. 90% of the ex-serfs in the empire who actually gained land after 1861 lived in the 8 western provinces. Along with Romania, Polish landless or domestic serfs were the only ones to be given land after serfdom was abolished. All this was to punish the szlachta's role in the uprisings of 1830 and 1863. By 1864 80% of szlachta were déclassé – downward social mobility. One quarter of petty nobles were worse off than the average serf. While 48.9% of the land in Russian Poland was in peasant hands, nobles still held onto 46%.

In the Second Polish Republic the privileges of the nobility were legally abolished by the March Constitution in 1921 and as such not reinstated by any succeeding Polish law.

== Culture ==
=== Sarmatism ===
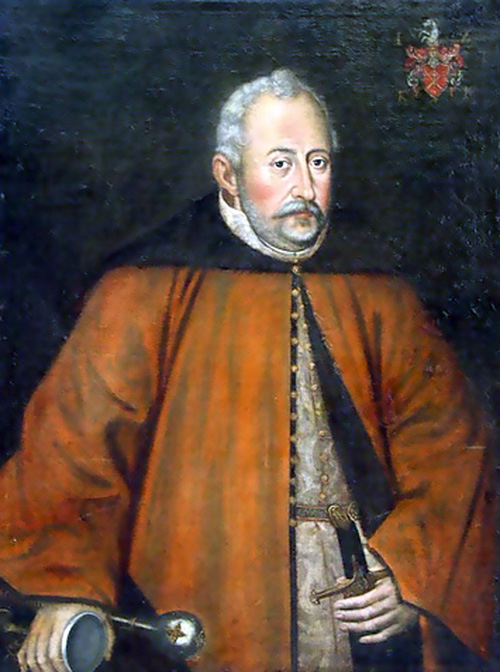
Jan Zamoyski, Hetman, Grand Crown Chancellor and a representative of Sarmatism

The szlachta's prevalent ideology, especially in the 17th and 18th centuries, was manifested in its adoption of "Sarmatism", a word derived from the legend that its origins reached back to the ancient tribe of an Iranic people, the Sarmatians. This nostalgic belief system embracing chivalry and courtliness became an important part of szlachta culture and affected all aspects of their lives. It was popularized by poets who exalted traditional village life, peace and pacifism. It was also manifested in oriental-style apparel, the żupan, kontusz, sukmana, pas kontuszowy, delia and made the scimitar-like szabla a near-obligatory item of everyday szlachta apparel. Sarmatism served to integrate a nobility of disparate provenance, as it sought to create a sense of national unity and pride in the szlachta's "Golden Liberty" złota wolność. It was marked furthermore by a linguistic affectation among the szlachta of mixing Polish and Latin vocabulary, producing a form of Polish Dog Latin peppered with "macaronisms" in everyday conversation.

=== Gastronomy ===
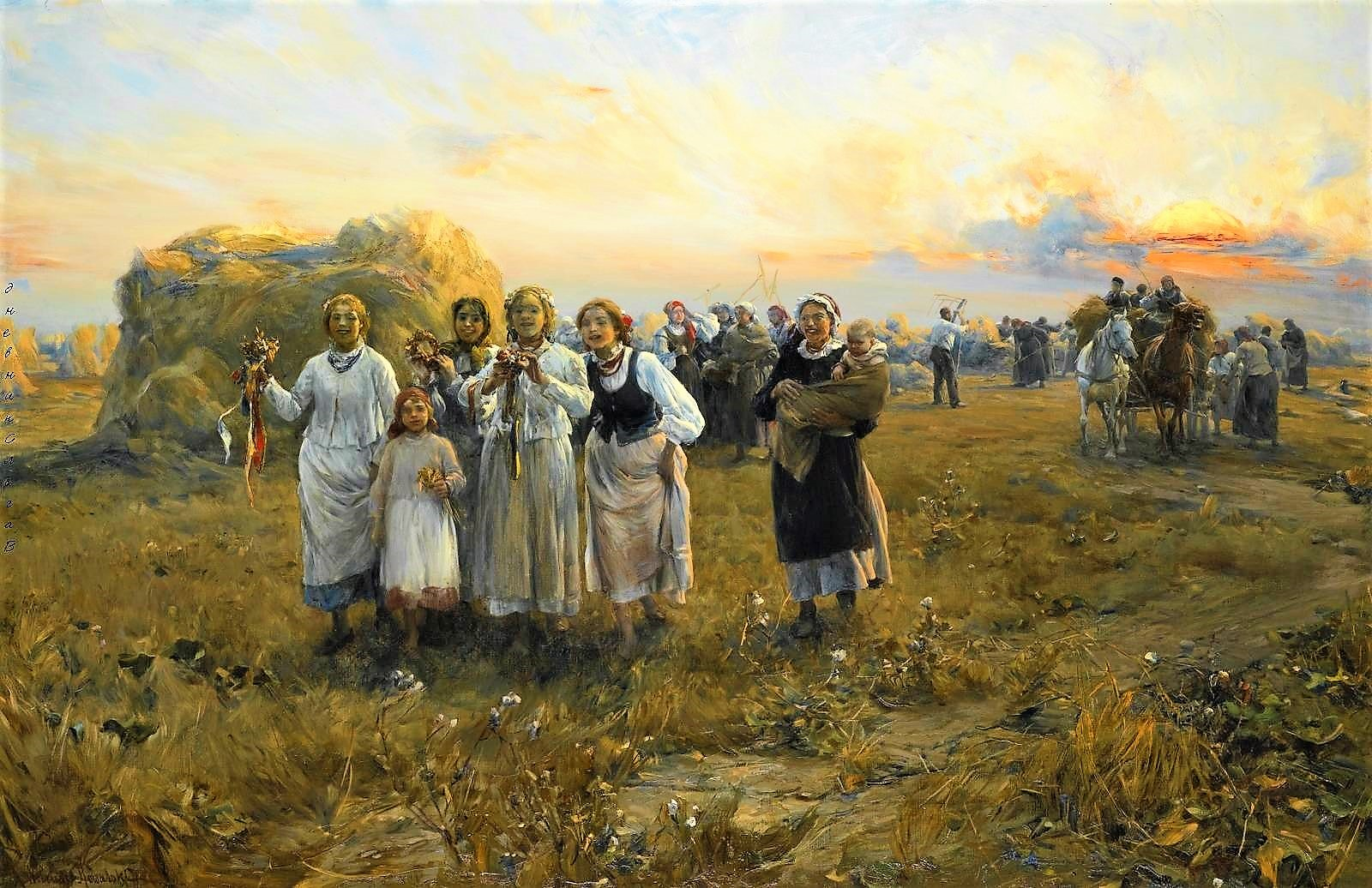
Dożynki by Alfred Wierusz-Kowalski, 1910

The szlachta, no less than the rest of the population, placed a particular accent on food. It was at the centre of courtly and estate entertaining and in good times, at the heart of village life. During the Age of Enlightenment, King Stanislaw August Poniatowski emulated the French Salons by holding his famed Thursday Lunches for intellectuals and artists, drawn chiefly from the szlachta. His Wednesday Lunches were gatherings for policy makers in science, education and politics.

There was a tradition, particularly in Mazovia, kept until the 20th century, of estate owners laying on a festive banquet at the completion of harvest for their staff, known as Dożynki, as a way of expressing an acknowledgment of their work. It was equivalent to a harvest festival. Polish food varied according to region, as elsewhere in Europe, and was influenced by settlers, especially Jewish cuisine, and occupying armies.

=== Hunting ===
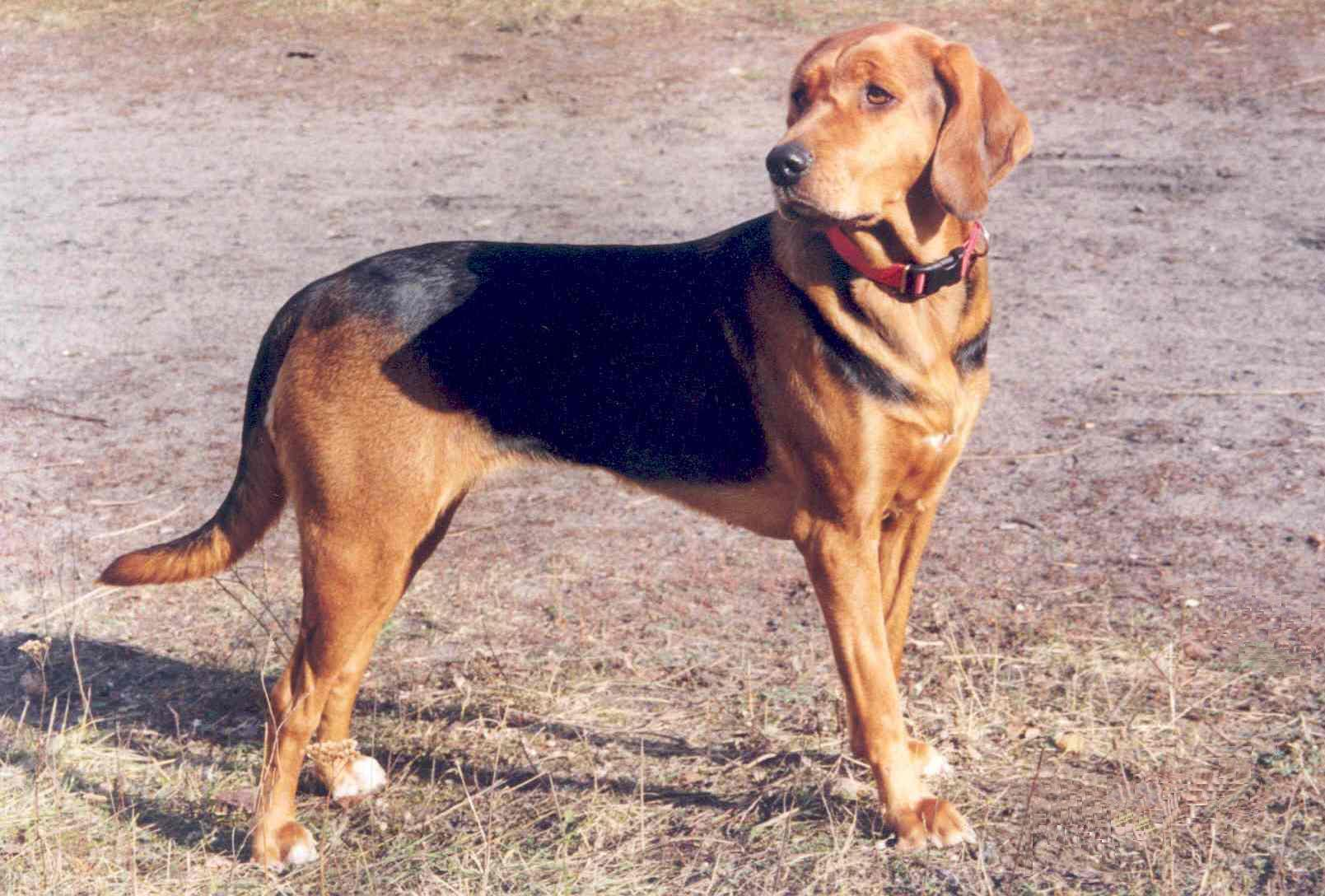
Ogar Polski

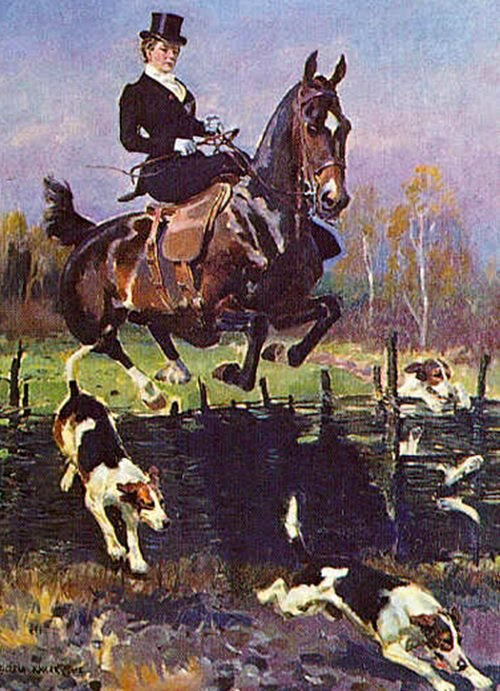
Elżbieta Potocka by Wojciech Kossak

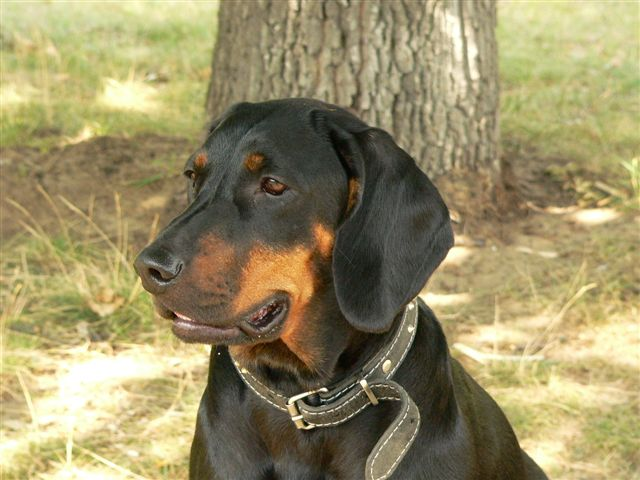
"Brach", Polish Hunting Dog

One of the favourite szlachta pastimes was hunting (łowiectwo). Before the formation of Poland as a state, hunting was accessible to everyone. With the introduction of rulers and rules, big game, generically zwierzyna: Aurochs, bison, deer and boar became the preserve of kings and princes on penalty of poachers' death. From the 13th century on the king would appoint a high-ranking courtier to the role of Master of the Hunt, Łowczy. In time, the penalties for poaching were commuted to fines and from around the 14th century, landowners acquired the right to hunt on their land. Small game, foxes, hare, badger and stoat etc. were 'fair game' to all comers. Hunting became one of the most popular social activities of the szlachta until the partitions, when different sets of restrictions in the three territories were introduced. This was with a view to curbing social interaction among the subject Poles. Over the centuries, at least two breeds of specialist hounds were bred in Poland. One was the Polish Hunting Dog, the brach. The other was the Ogar Polski. Count Xavier Branicki was so nostalgic about Polish hunting, that when he settled in France in the mid 19th century, and restored his estate at the Chateau de Montresor, he ordered a brace of Ogar Polski hounds from the Polish breeder and szlachcic, Piotr Orda.

=== Women as purveyors of culture ===
High-born women in Polish–Lithuanian Commonwealth exerted political and cultural influence throughout history in their own country and abroad, as queens, princesses and the wives or widows of magnates. Their cultural activities came into sharper relief in the 18th century with their hosting of salons in the French manner. They went on to publish as translators and writers and as facilitators of educational and social projects.

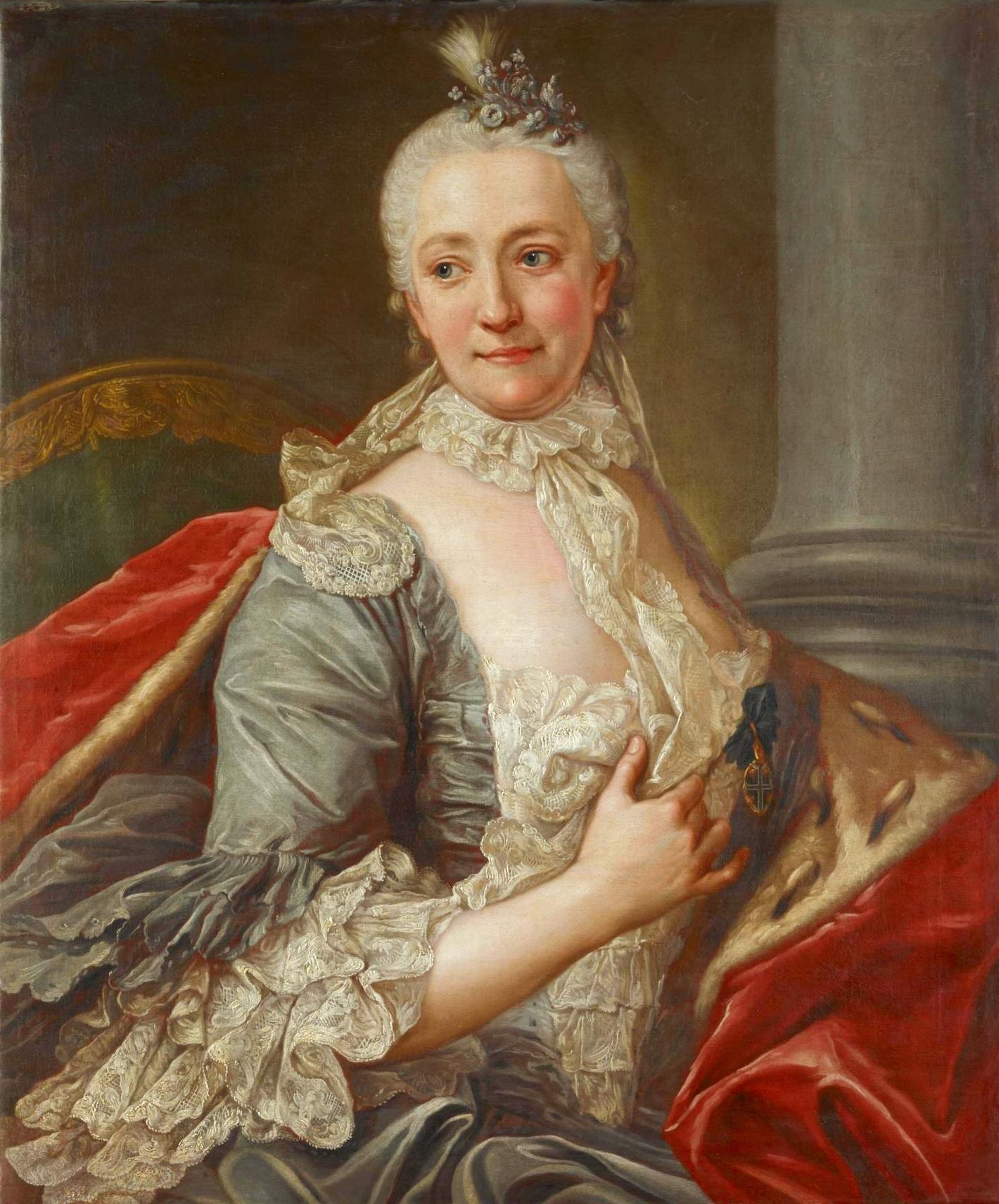
Barbara Sanguszko, philanthropist, writer and salon hostess at Poddębice. Oil by Marcello Bacciarelli

Notable women members of the szlachta who exerted political and/or cultural influence include:

- Queen Jadwiga (1373 ог 1374–1399)
- Bona Sforza (1494–1557), second wife of Sigismund I the Old
- Zofia Lubomirska
- Anna Jabłonowska
- Elzbieta Lubomirska
- Eleonora Czartoryska
- Izabela Czartoryska
- Barbara Sanguszko (1718–1791), poet, translator and moralist
- Tekla Teresa Lubienska (1767–1810), poet, playwright and translator

== Demographics and stratification ==
The szlachta differed in many respects from the nobility in other countries. The most important difference was that, while in most European countries the nobility lost power as the ruler strove for absolute monarchy, in the Polish–Lithuanian Commonwealth a reverse process occurred: the nobility actually gained power at the expense of the king, and enabled the political system to evolve into an oligarchy.

Szlachta members were also proportionately more numerous than their equivalents in all other European countries, constituting 6–12% of the entire population.^{[a]} By contrast, nobles in other European countries, except for Spain, amounted to a mere 1–3%. Most of the szlachta were "minor nobles" or smallholders. In Lithuania the minor nobility made up to 3/4 of the total szlachta population. By the mid-16th century the szlachta class consisted of at least 500,000 persons (some 25,000 families). Polish historian Tadeusz Korzon carried out an estimation of the social structure of Poland based on the documents of 1770–1780s, such as tax registers, partial censuses, etc. His estimate for the number of szlachta was 725,000 of total population 8.8 million. For comparison with other social classes, Christian clergy counted 50,000, Christian mieszczaństwo (burghers) counted 500,000, peasants of various categories (włościanie): 6.4 million, Jews (the fast growing group), e.g., 750,000 in 1764 and 900,000 in 1790. Korzon counted Armenians, Tatars, Greeks, and Russian raskolniks as separate social groups, totaling 250,000-300,000.

The proportion of nobles in the population varied across regions. In the 16th century, the highest proportion of nobles lived in the Płock Voivodeship (24,6%) and in Podlachia (26,7%), while Galicia had numerically the largest szlachta population. In districts, such as Wizna and Łomża, the szlachta constituted nearly half of the population. Regions with the lowest percentage of nobles were the Kraków Voivodeship with (1,7%), Royal Prussia with (3%) and the Sieradz Voivodeship with 4,6%. Before the Union of Lublin, inequality among nobles in terms of wealth and power was far greater in the Grand Duchy of Lithuania than in the Polish Kingdom. The further south and east one went, the more the territory was dominated by magnate families and other nobles. In the Lithuanian and Ruthenian palatinates, poor nobles were more likely to rent smallholdings from magnates than to own land themselves.

It has been said that the ruling elites were the only socio-political milieu to whom a sense of national consciousness could be attributed. All szlachta members, irrespective of their cultural/ethnic background, were regarded as belonging to a single "political nation" within the Commonwealth. Arguably, a common culture, the Catholic religion and the Polish language were seen as the main unifying factors in the dual state. Prior to the Partitions there was said to have been no Polish national identity as such. Only szlachta members, irrespective of their ethnicity or culture of origin, were considered as "Poles".

Despite Polonisation in Lithuania and Ruthenia in the 17th-18th centuries, a large part of the lower szlachta managed to retain their cultural identity in various ways. Due to poverty most of the local szlachta had never had access to formal education nor to Polish language teaching and hence could not be expected to self-identify as Poles. It was common even for wealthy and in practice Polonised szlachta members still to refer to themselves as Lithuanian, Litwin or Ruthenian, Rusyn.

Although born a Lithuanian and a Lithuanian I shall die, I must use the Polish idiom in my homeland.

— Janusz Radziwiłł, in letter to his brother Krzysztof

According to Polish estimates from the 1930s, 300,000 members of the common nobles s zlachta zagrodowa – inhabited the subcarpathian region of the Second Polish Republic out of 800,000 in the whole country. 90% of them were Ukrainian-speaking and 80% were Ukrainian Greek Catholics. In other parts of Ukraine with a significant szlachta population, such as the Bar or the Ovruch regions, the situation was similar despite Russification and earlier Polonization. As an example:

... The first official records of the Chopovsky family, as clan members of the Korwin coat of arms, date back to mid-XVII century. As the Chopovsky family multiplied, by 1861 they were already 3063 souls of both sexes. They were considered szlachta members, but neither their way of life nor their clothing distinguished them from the neighbouring peasants, except that they were more prosperous and possessed more of their own land [...]. When Uniates began joining the Orthodox church in 1839 - The Russian government liquidated the Uniate church after the Polotsk Convocation - 43 souls of both sexes switched to the Roman faith, while the rest of the Chopovsky (86%) returned to Orthodoxy. The Heraldic Office of the Russian Senate declined to certify the Chopovsky family's noble status, but the land remained theirs. The exception were the Prokopenko-Chopovsky branch of the family who were received into the Russian nobility in 1858,

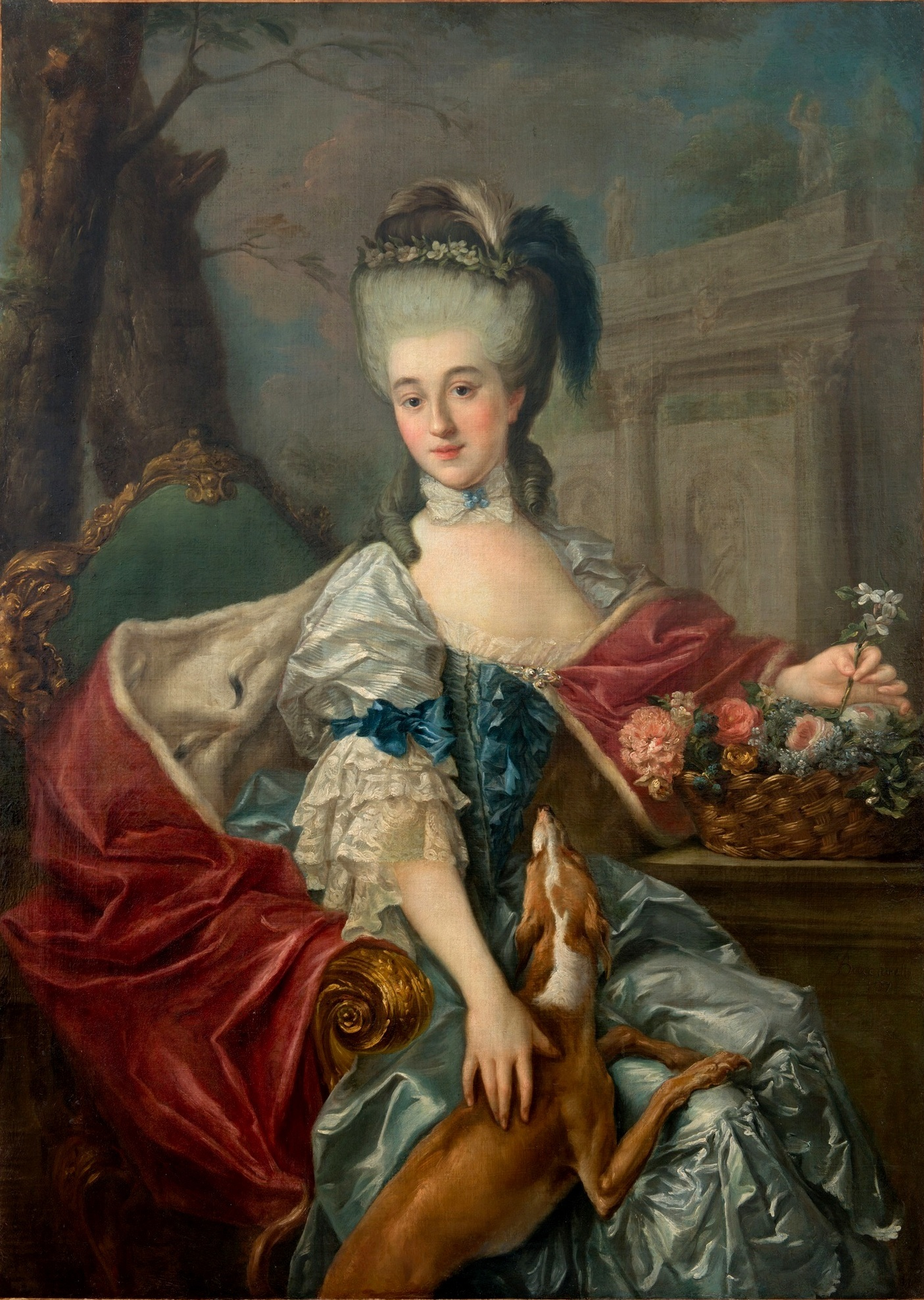
Elżbieta Czartoryska as Bacciarelli's Blue Marquise

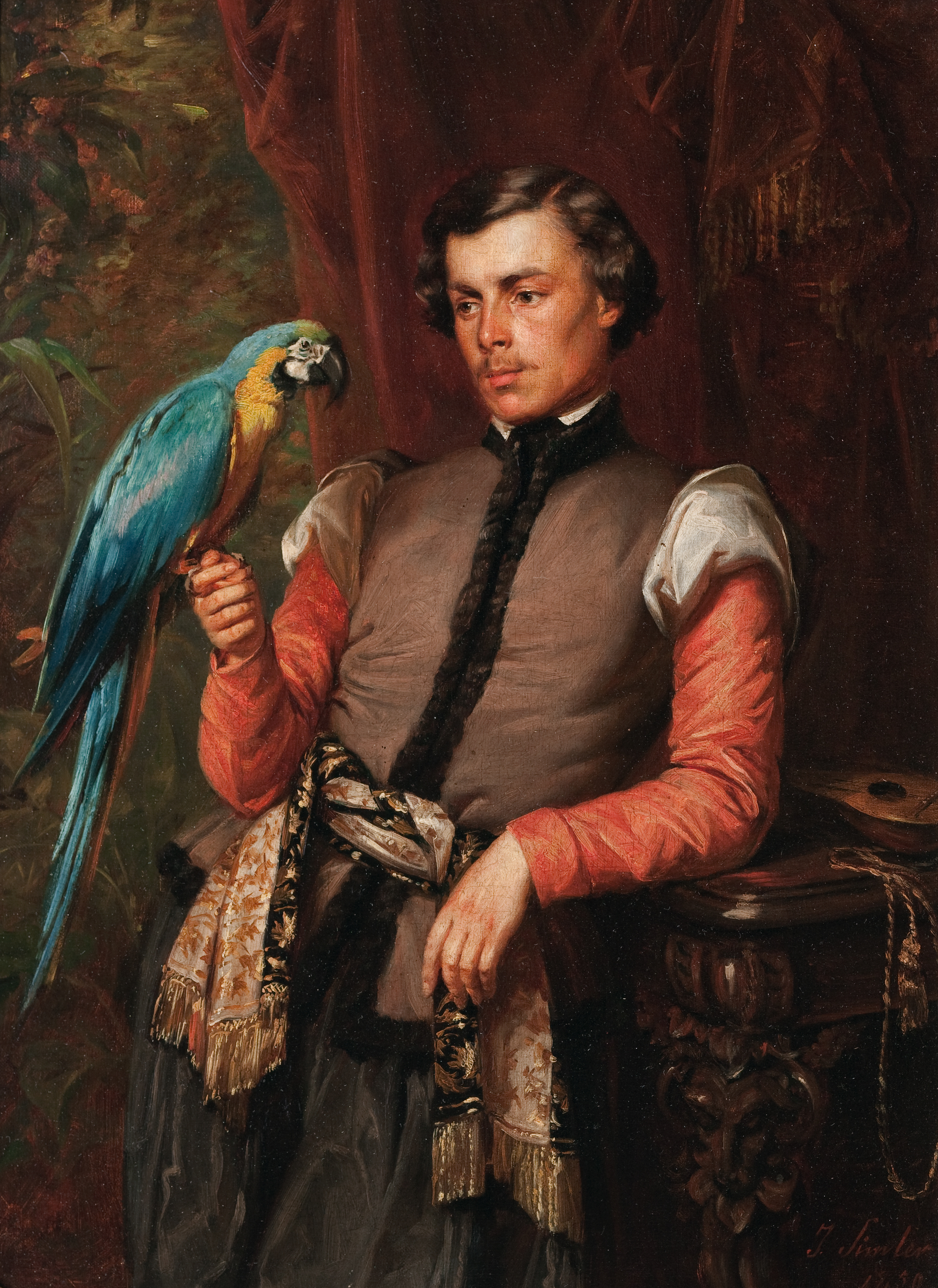
Polish Nobleman with a Parrot, by Józef Simmler, 1859.

However the era of sovereign rule by the szlachta ended earlier than in other countries, excluding France, in 1795 (see Partitions of Poland). Since then their legitimacy and fate depended on the legislation and policies of the Russian Empire, Kingdom of Prussia and Habsburg monarchy. Their privileges became increasingly limited, and were ultimately dissolved by the March Constitution of Poland in 1921.

There were a number of avenues to upward social mobility and the attainment of nobility. The szlachta was not rigidly exclusive or closed as a class, but according to heraldic sources, the total number of legal ennoblements issued between the 14th and mid-18th century, is estimated at 800. This is an average of about two ennoblements per year.

According to two English journalists Richard Holt Hutton and Walter Bagehot writing on the subject in 1864,

The condition of the country at the present day shows that the population consisted of two different peoples, between whom there was an impassable barrier. There is the Sliachta, or caste of nobles (the descendants of Lekh), on the one hand, and the serfs or peasantry, who constitute the bulk of the population, on the other.

and

... the Statute of 1633 completed the slavery of the other classes, by proclaiming the principle that 'the air enslaves the man,' in virtue of which every peasant who had lived for a year upon the estate of a noble was held to be his property. Nowhere in history - nowhere in the world - do we ever see a homogeneous nation organise itself in a form like that which has prevailed from the earliest times in Poland. But where there has been an intrusion of a dominant people, or settlers, who have not fused into the original population, there we find an exact counterpart of Polish society: the dominant settlers establishing themselves as an upper caste, all politically equal among themselves, and holding the lands (or, more frequently, simply drawing the rents) of the country.

Sociologist and historian, Jerzy Ryszard Szacki said in this context,

... the Polish nobility was a closed group (apart from a few exceptions, many of which were contrary to the law), in which membership was inherited.

Others assert the szlachta were not a social class, but a caste, among them, historian Adam Zamoyski,

A more apt analogy might perhaps be made with the Rajputs of northern India. ... unlike any other gentry in Europe, the szlachta was not limited by nor did it depend for its status on either wealth, or land, or royal writ. It was defined by its function, that of a warrior caste.

Jerzy Szacki continues,

While Aleksander Świętochowski wrote: 'If from the deeds of the Polish nobility we took away excesses and the exclusiveness of caste, ...'.

Low-born individuals, including townsfolk mieszczanie, peasants chłopi, but not Jews Żydzi, could and did rise to official ennoblement in Commonwealth society, although Charles-Joseph, 7th Prince of Ligne, while trying to obtain Polish noble status, is supposed to have said in 1784,

It is easier to become a duke in Germany, than to be counted among Polish nobles.

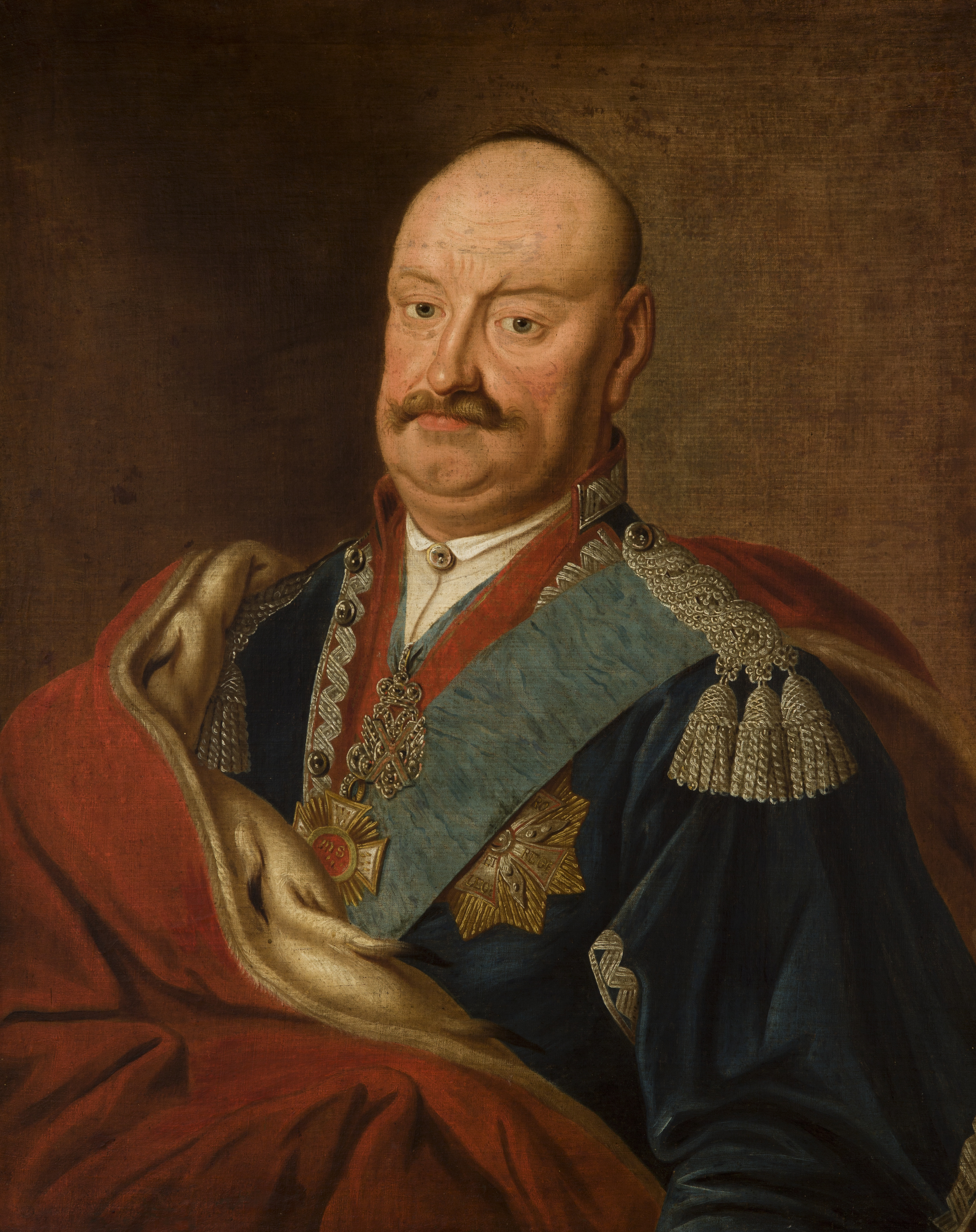
Karol Stanisław Radziwiłł, the richest noble of his time.

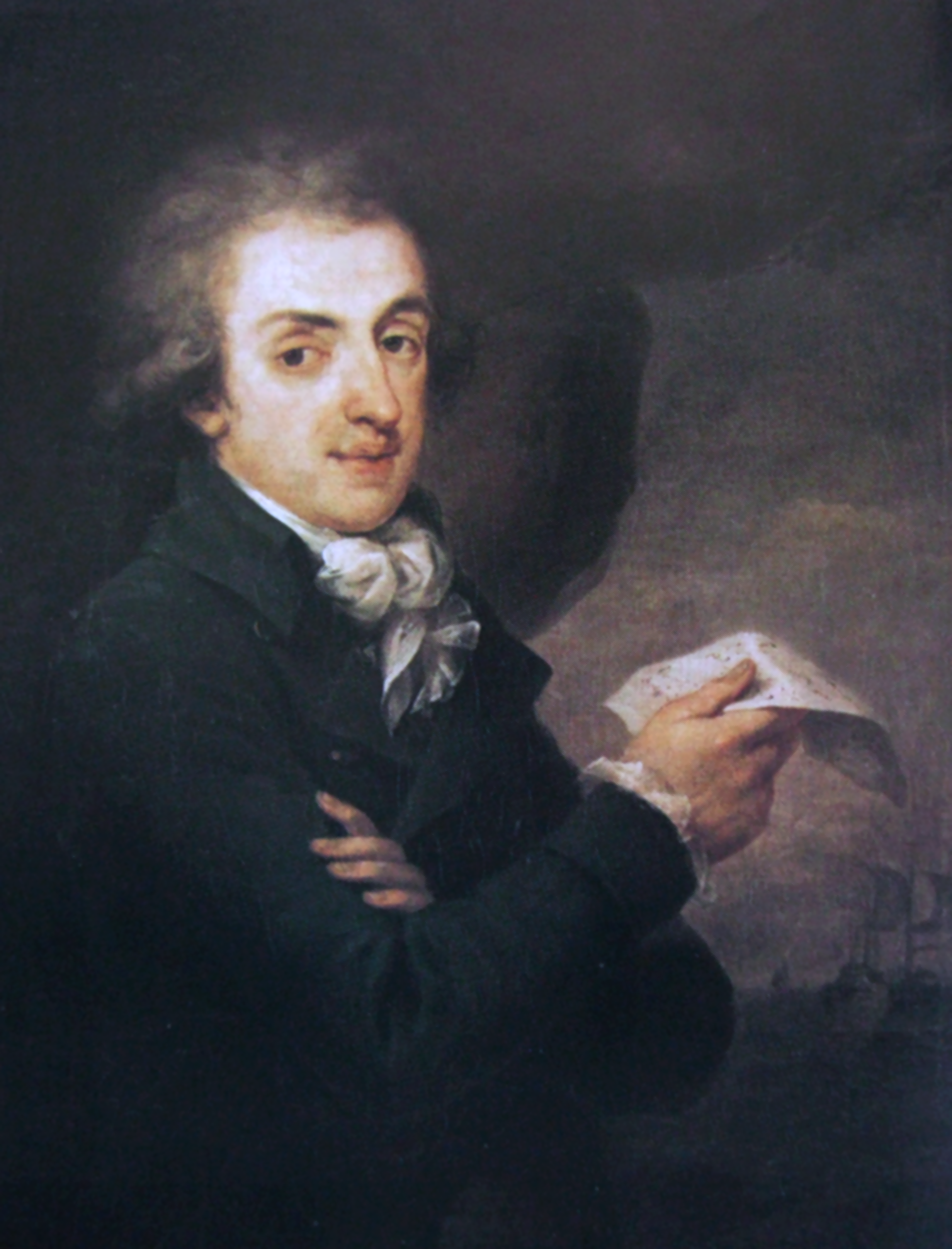
Antoni Protazy Potocki, banker and industrialist, a pioneer of Polish capitalism.

According to heraldic sources 1,600 is the total estimated number of all legal ennoblements throughout the history of Kingdom of Poland and Polish–Lithuanian Commonwealth from the 14th century onward, half of which were enacted in the final years of the late 18th century. Hutton and Bagehot,

... for the barrier of exclusion was partly thrown down in the last days of the monarchy ....

Each szlachcic was said to hold enormous potential influence over the country's politics, far greater than that enjoyed by the citizens of modern democratic countries. Between 1652 and 1791, any nobleman could potentially nullify all the proceedings of a given sejm or sejmik by exercising his individual right of liberum veto – Latin for "I do not allow" – except in the case of a confederated sejm or confederated sejmik.

In old Poland, a nobleman could only marry a noblewoman, as intermarriage between "castes" was fraught with difficulties (endogamy); but, children of a legitimate marriage followed the condition of the father, never the mother, therefore, only the father transmitted his nobility to his children. See patrilineality. A noble woman married to a commoner could not transmit her nobility to her husband and their children. Any individual could attain ennoblement (nobilitacja) for special services to the state. A foreign noble might be naturalized as a Polish noble through the mechanism called the Indygenat, certified by the king. Later, from 1641, it could only be done by a general sejm. By the eighteenth century all these trends contributed to the great increase in the proportion of szlachta in the total population.

In theory all szlachta members were social equals and were formally legal peers. Those who held civic appointments were more privileged but their roles were not hereditary. Those who held honorary appointments were superior in the hierarchy but these positions were only granted for a lifetime. Some tenancies became hereditary and went with both privilege and title. Nobles who were not direct Lessees of the Crown but held land from other lords were only peers "de iure". The poorest enjoyed the same rights as the wealthiest magnate. The exceptions were a few symbolically privileged families such as the Radziwiłł, Lubomirski and Czartoryski, who held honorary aristocratic titles bestowed by foreign courts and recognised in Poland which granted them use of titles such as "Prince" or "Count". See also The Princely Houses of Poland. All other szlachta simply addressed each other by their given name or as "Brother, Sir" Panie bracie or the feminine equivalent. The other forms of address would be "Illustrious and Magnificent Lord", "Magnificent Lord", "Generous Lord" or "Noble Lord" in descending order, or simply "His/Her Grace Lord/Lady".

The notion that all Polish nobles were social equals, regardless of their financial status or offices held, is enshrined in a traditional Polish adage:

Szlachcic na zagrodzie
równy wojewodzie.

renderable in English:

"The noble on the croft
is the voivode's equal."

or, preserving the Polish original's rhyme scheme:

"The noble behind his garden wall
is the province governor's equal."

=== Szlachta categories ===
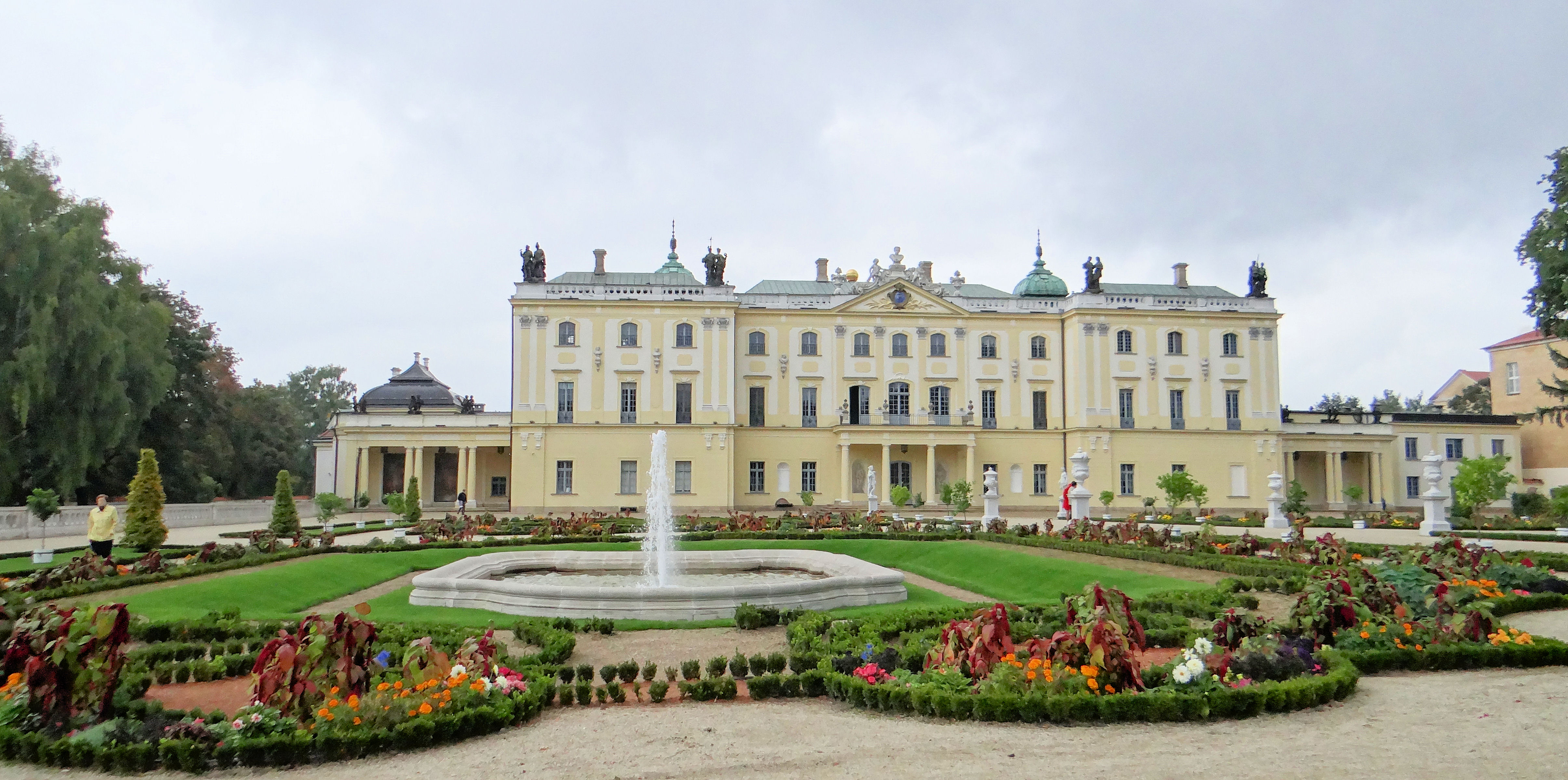
Magnate palace: Branicki family palace

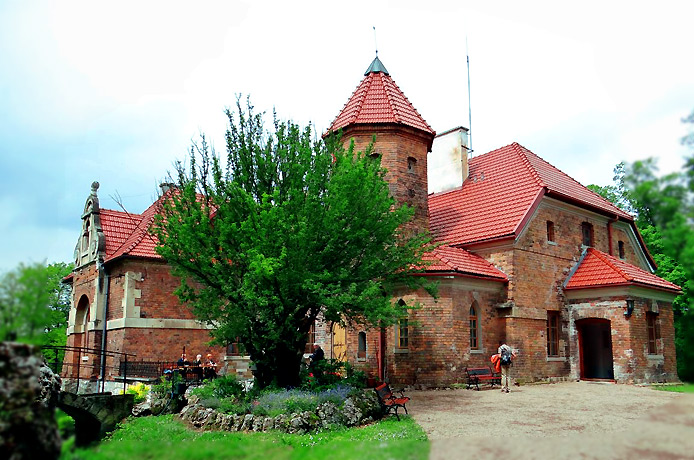
Middle nobility manor house (dwór): Żądło-Dąbrowski family manor

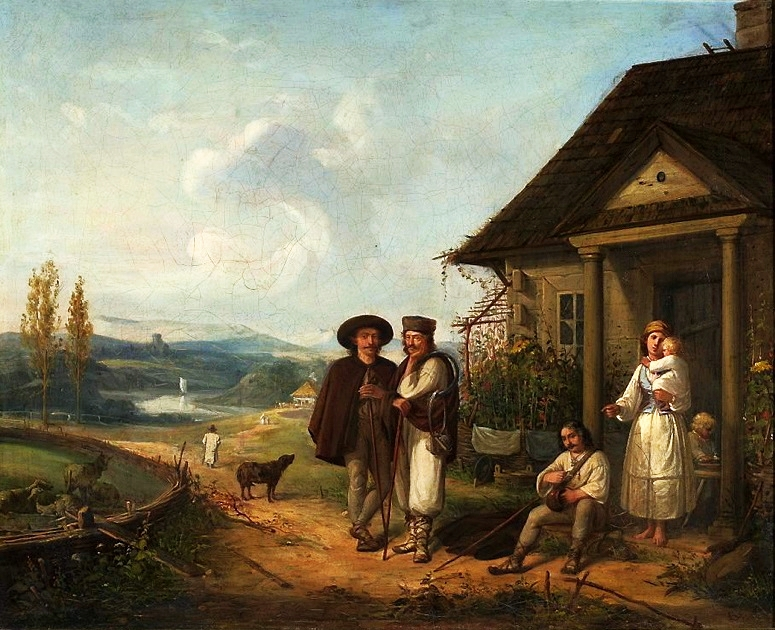
Lesser szlachta/nobility homestead (dwór)

The nobility were divided by wealth into:

- magnates, the wealthiest class: owners of vast lands, towns, many villages, and thousands of peasants
- middle nobility (średnia szlachta): owners of one or more villages, often bearing official titles, or deputies from sejmiks (regional sejms) to the general Sejm
- petty nobility (drobna szlachta): owners of part of a village or of no land at all, they were often referred to by a variety of colourful Polish terms, including:
  - szlachta zaściankowa – from zaścianek, poorer members of the szlachta settled together in related families in one village, neighborhood/village nobility.
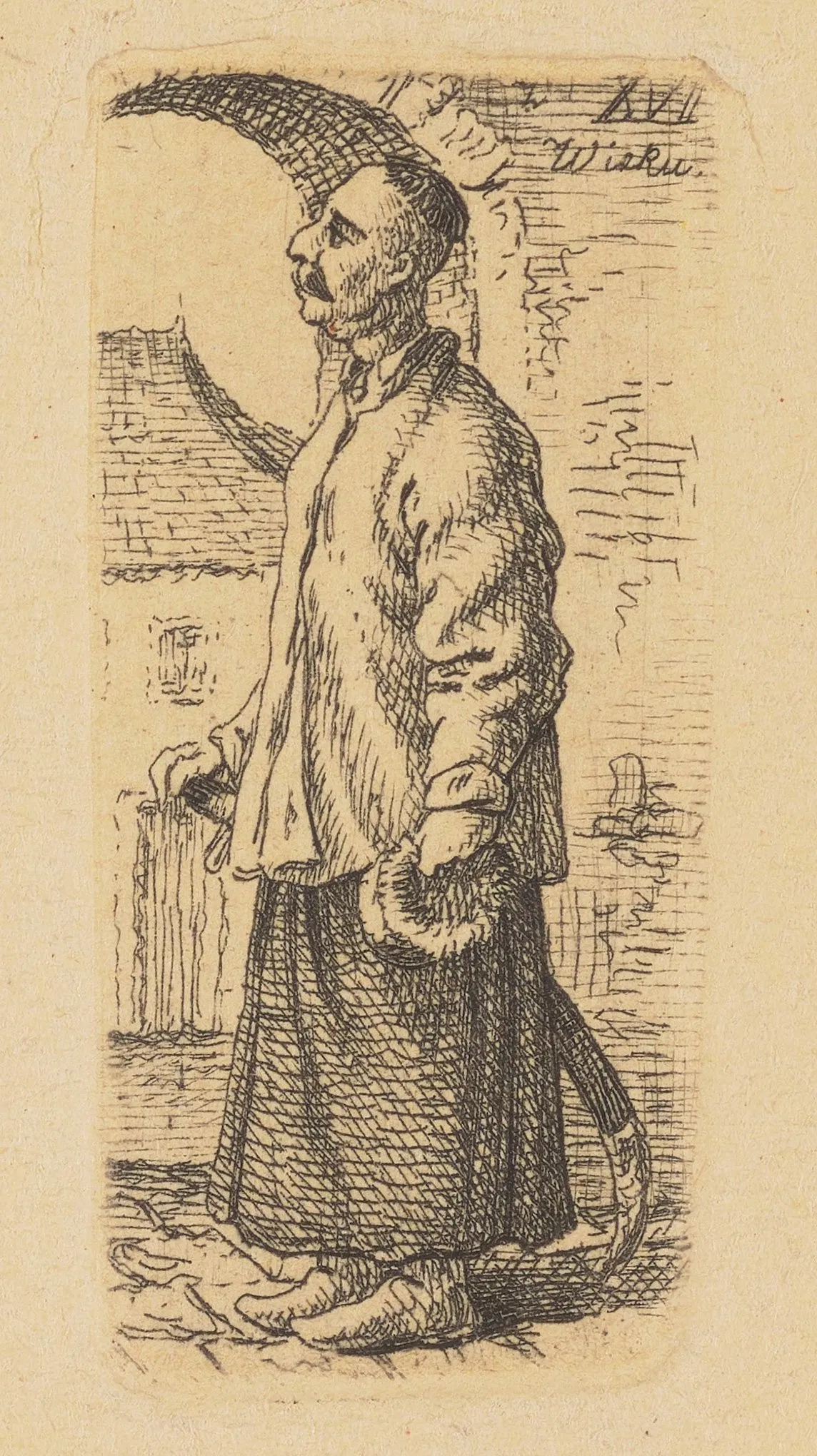
    Poor szlachtic with the only proud possession: karabela
  - szaraczkowa – grey nobility, from their grey, woollen, undyed żupany
  - okoliczna – local nobility, similar to zaściankowa
  - zagrodowa – from zagroda, a croft, often little more than a peasant's dwelling
  - zagonowa – from zagon, a small unit of land measure, hide nobility
  - cząstkowa – partial, owners of only part of a single village
  - panek – little pan (i.e., lordling), term used in Kaszuby, the Kashubian region, also one of the legal terms for legally separated lower nobility in late medieval and early modern Poland
  - hreczkosiej – buckwheat sower – those who had to work their fields themselves because they had no peasants.
  - szlachta służebna – petty nobility who possessed land on the condition of military service (mainly of Ruthenian origin, in Eastern Poland)
  - quit-rent szlachta (szlachta czynszowa) – a class of impoverished szlachta who rented estates in the vast lands of magnates (predominantly in Ruthenian lands)
  - szlachta poddańcza – a step below the quit-rent szlachta: they required to work for the landlord who allotted them some land.
  - barefoot szlachta (gołota szlachecka, szlachta-gołota), i.e., the landless szlachta, who neither owned or rented land; the poorest szlachta considered the "lowest of the high."
  - brukowa – town-street nobility: landless szlachta who earned a living in towns like other townsfolk

Polish landed gentry – ziemianie, or ziemiaństwo – was a social class of landowners with manorial estates. The vast majority were szlachta, including lesser nobility, and owned at least part of a village. Since titular manorial lordships were also open to burgers of certain privileged cities with royal charters, not all landed gentry had hereditary noble status. The term ziemiaństwo was also applied to wealthier landed peasants. Magnates, as owners of vast lands, generally were considered a separate social class.

Landless szlachta were sometimes excluded from taking part in sejmiks. Its political rights were removed altogether by the Constitution of 3 May 1791. The purpose of the move was to eliminate the purchases of szlachta-gołota voices in sejmiks by magnates to use them, e.g., in voting or in executing liberum veto.

Półpanek ("half-lord"); also podpanek/pidpanek ("sub-lord") in Podolia and Ukrainian accent – a derogatory term for a petty szlachcic pretending to be wealthy.

In the Russian Partition of Poland, Tsar Nicholas I signed a ukase on 19 October 1831, titled "On the Division and Disposition of Nobility in the Western Governorates", which required those claiming noble status to provide evidence to the Russian Office of Heraldry. The result was a drastic decrease in the number of petty szlachta, who were demoted into estates of the realm required to pay taxes.

== See also ==
- List of Polish titled nobility
- List of szlachta
- Lithuanian nobility
- Polish heraldry
- Polish landed gentry (Ziemiaństwo)
- Polish name
- Silva rerum
- Ukrainian nobility from Galicia

== Explanatory notes ==
a. Estimates of the proportion of szlachta vary widely: 10–12% of the total population of historic Polish–Lithuanian Commonwealth, around 8% of the total population in 1791 (up from 6.6% in the 16th century) or 6–8%.

== General bibliography ==
- Aleksander Brückner, Słownik etymologiczny języka polskiego (Etymological Dictionary of the Polish Language), first edition, Kraków, Krakowska Spółka Wydawnicza, 1927 (9th edition, Warsaw, Wiedza Powszechna, 2000).
- (in English) Górecki, Piotr (1992). Economy, Society, and Lordship in Medieval Poland: 1100-1250. New York, NEW YORK: Holmes and Meier Publishers, Inc. ISBN 0-8419-1318-8. OCLC 25787903.
- Manteuffel, Tadeusz (1982), The Formation of the Polish State: The Period of Ducal Rule, 963–1194, Detroit, MICHIGAN, U.S.A.: Wayne State University Press, ISBN 978-0-8143-1682-5.
- Żernicki-Szeliga Emilian v., Der Polnische Adel und die demselben hinzugetretenen andersländischen Adelsfamilien, General-Verzeichnis. Published by Verlag v. Henri Grand. Hamburg 1900. https://archive.org/details/derpolnischeade00szegoog (Ger). This is a reasonably modern and comprehensive list of 3000 Polish and settler szlachta families and their crests, sourced from, among others, Niesiecki, Paprocki and Boniecki. 598 pages. Accessed 2018-11-02.
