= Order of Saint Stanislaus =

Polish military decoration

Order of Saint Stanislaus Order Św. Stanisława Biskupa i Męczennika
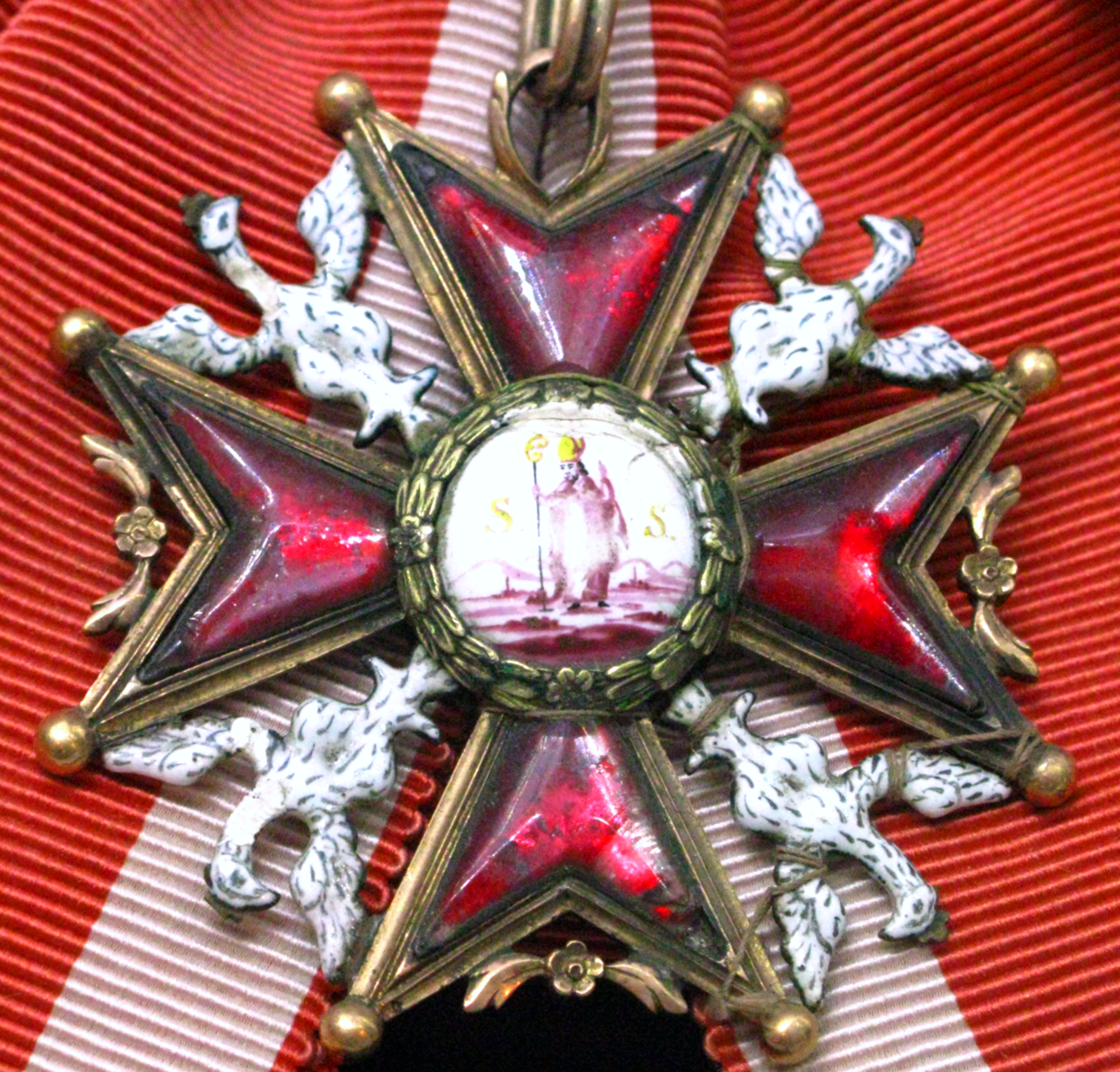
- Cross of the Polish Order of Saint Stanislaus
- Type: Order of knighthood/ Order of merit
- Country: Polish–Lithuanian Commonwealth; Duchy of Warsaw; Kingdom of Poland; Russian Empire
- Royal house: Poniatowski (7 May 1765 – 25 November 1795); Wettin (9 June 1807 – 22 May 1815); Romanov (9 June 1815 – 16 March 1917)
- Religious affiliation: Roman Catholic (7 May 1765 – 22 May 1815); None from 1815
- Status: Abolished, 16 March 1917
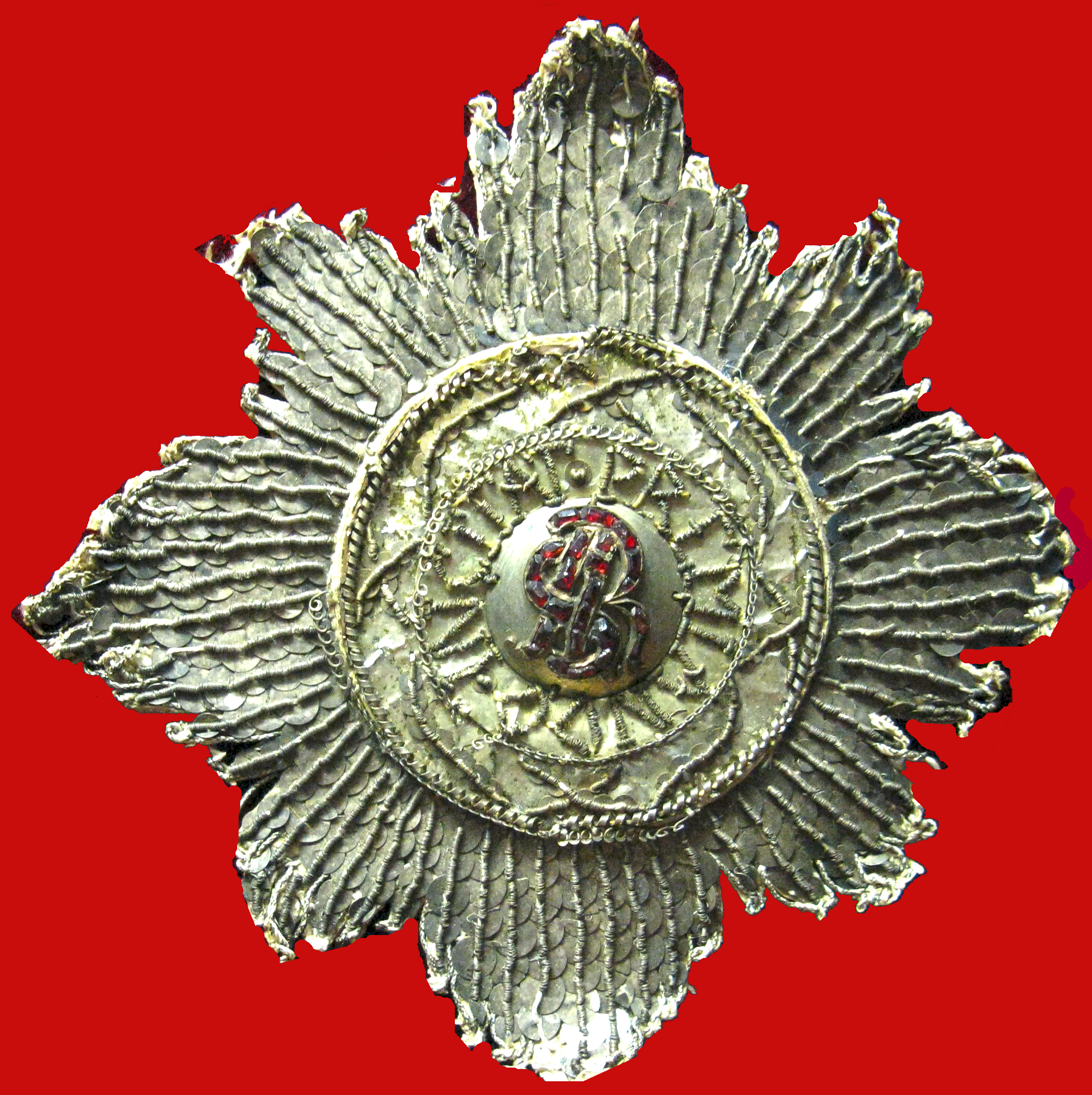
- Star of the Polish Order of Saint Stanislaus with Latin phrase Praemiando Incitat

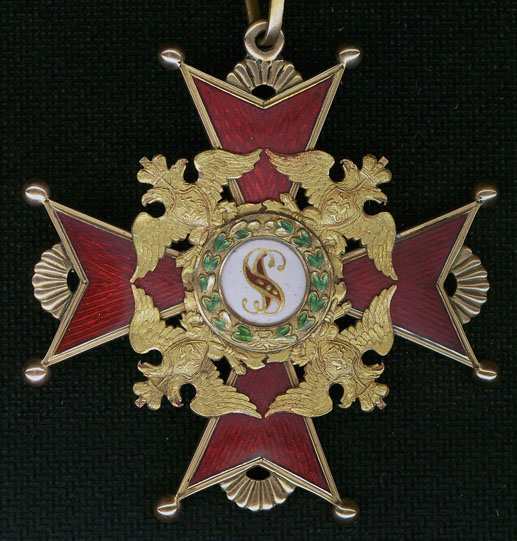
Cross of the Order of Saint Stanislaus (c. 1860)

The Order of Saint Stanislaus (Polish: Order Św. Stanisława Biskupa i Męczennika, Russian: Орден Святого Станислава), also spelled Stanislas, was a Polish order of knighthood founded in 1765 by King Stanisław August Poniatowski of the Polish–Lithuanian Commonwealth. It remained under the Kingdom of Poland between 1765 and 1831. In 1831 it was incorporated under the Russian Empire until the Russian Revolution (1917).

Today, there are two recognised orders that claim descent from the original Order of Saint Stanislaus: the Russian dynastic Order of Saint Stanislaus, awarded by the head of the House of Romanov as former sovereigns of the Russian Empire, and the Polish Order of Polonia Restituta, a governmental order of merit awarded by the President of Poland and considered by some as a type of successor.

== History ==
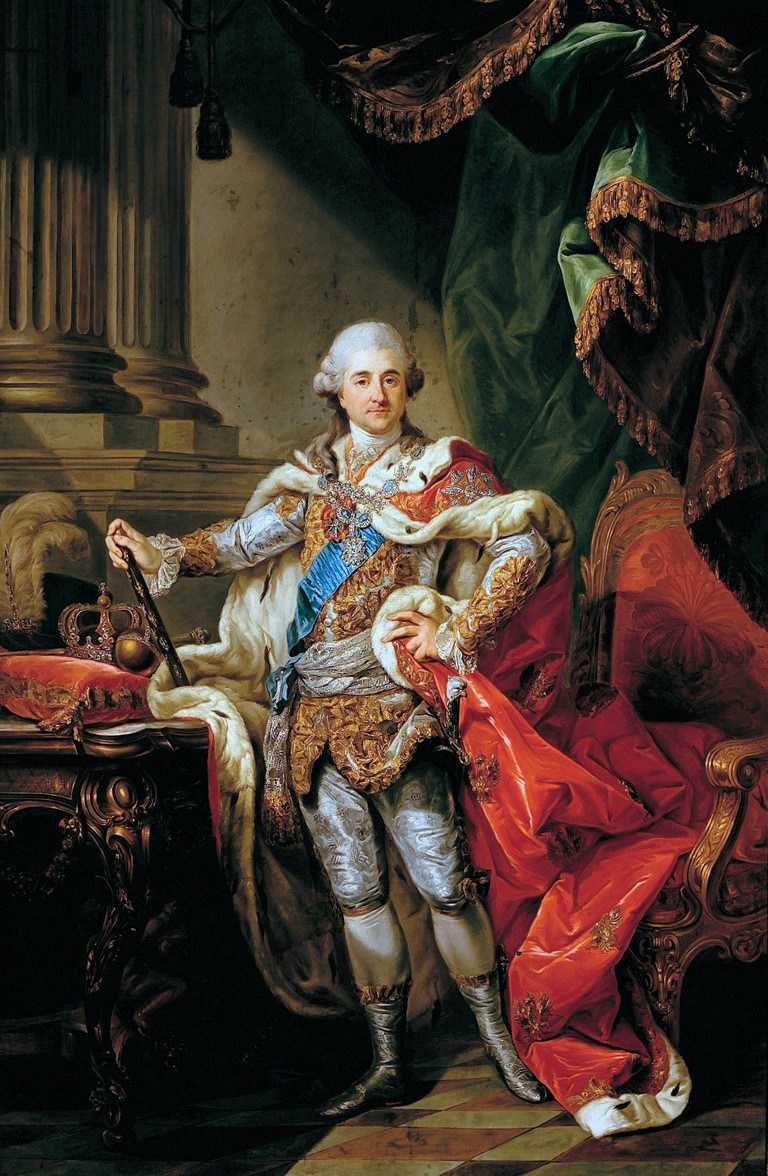
Stanislaus II Augustus Poniatowski, King of Poland, founder of the Order of the Knights of Saint Stanislaus, Bishop and Martyr on 7 May 1765.

=== Polish–Lithuanian Commonwealth ===
Stanisław August Poniatowski, King of Poland, established the Order of the Knights of Saint Stanislaus, Bishop and Martyr on 8 May 1765 Initially, the order was limited to 100 members who were required to prove four generations of nobility. The knights were required to pay for donations to poor people and to adhere to various rules of chivalry.

Due to the rising influence of the Russian Empire on Central European affairs, the rules of awarding of the order were broken. After the Partitions of Poland, the order was resurrected in the Duchy of Warsaw, bestowing upon its recipients the title of hereditary nobility and requiring donations to a Warsaw hospital. Since 1815 in the Polish (Congress) Kingdom, the order, originally in a single class, was retained and divided into four classes.

=== Russian Empire ===
Following the 1830 November Uprising, an extraordinary meeting of the Sejm of Congress Poland deposed Emperor Nicholas I of Russia from the throne of Poland on 25 January 1831, while he was also Grand Master of the Order of Saint Stanislaus. After the collapse of the uprising in October 1831, the Imperial House of Romanov established the Royal and Imperial Order of Saint Stanislaus, incorporating it into the honours system of the Russian Empire in 1832, where it remained officially until the Russian Revolution 1917.

The order was abolished with the fall of the Romanovs in 1917 but, unlike other Polish orders awarded by the Tsars, the Order of Saint Stanislaus was not revived by the newly independent Second Polish Republic (possibly because in its Russian form it was often awarded by the imperial government to those Poles who co-operated with Russian rule making the order a symbol of subservience to an occupying power).

Instead, the newly founded Order of Polonia Restituta was created as an attributed Polish successor to the order.

== Insignia ==
Both the Polish and Russian badges hung from a red ribbon with white strips near its borders (i.e., the colors of the Polish coat of arms and flag), a ribbon which they share with the modern Order of Polonia Restituta.

The order also had an eight-pointed star with straight rays with a central medallion bearing the letters "SS" surrounded by the Latin words "Praemiando incitat", which is in turn surrounded by a laurel wreath. The star has essentially the same design in both its Polish and Russian forms.

=== Polish ===
The original Polish badge of the order was a red enameled Maltese cross with white enameled Polish eagles between its arms and with a central medallion bearing an enameled image of Saint Stanislaus in his episcopal vestment surrounded by a gold laurel wreath.

In its original Polish form the knights of the Order wore a red, white and silver habit modelled on the traditional dress of a Polish nobleman (i.e., zupan, kontusz, pas kontuszowy and delia).

=== Russian ===
In the Russian version of the badge, the Polish white eagles were replaced with gold Russian double-headed imperial eagles, their wings partially overlapping the arms of the cross and the central medallion bearing the letters "SS" in red on a white enamel background instead of the original image of the saintly bishop, surrounded by a green enamel laural wreath. There is also a semi-circle of gold rays between each of the points of arms of the Maltese cross.

== Legacy ==
Today, there are two main competing claims to the represent the Order of Saint Stanislaus: the Russian Order of Saint Stanislaus (Imperial House of Romanov), awarded by the head of the House of Romanov, and the Polish Order of Polonia Restituta, a governmental order of merit awarded by the President of Poland and considered by some as a type of successor.
