= Sarmatism =

Baroque-era ethnocultural ideology in Poland-Lithuania

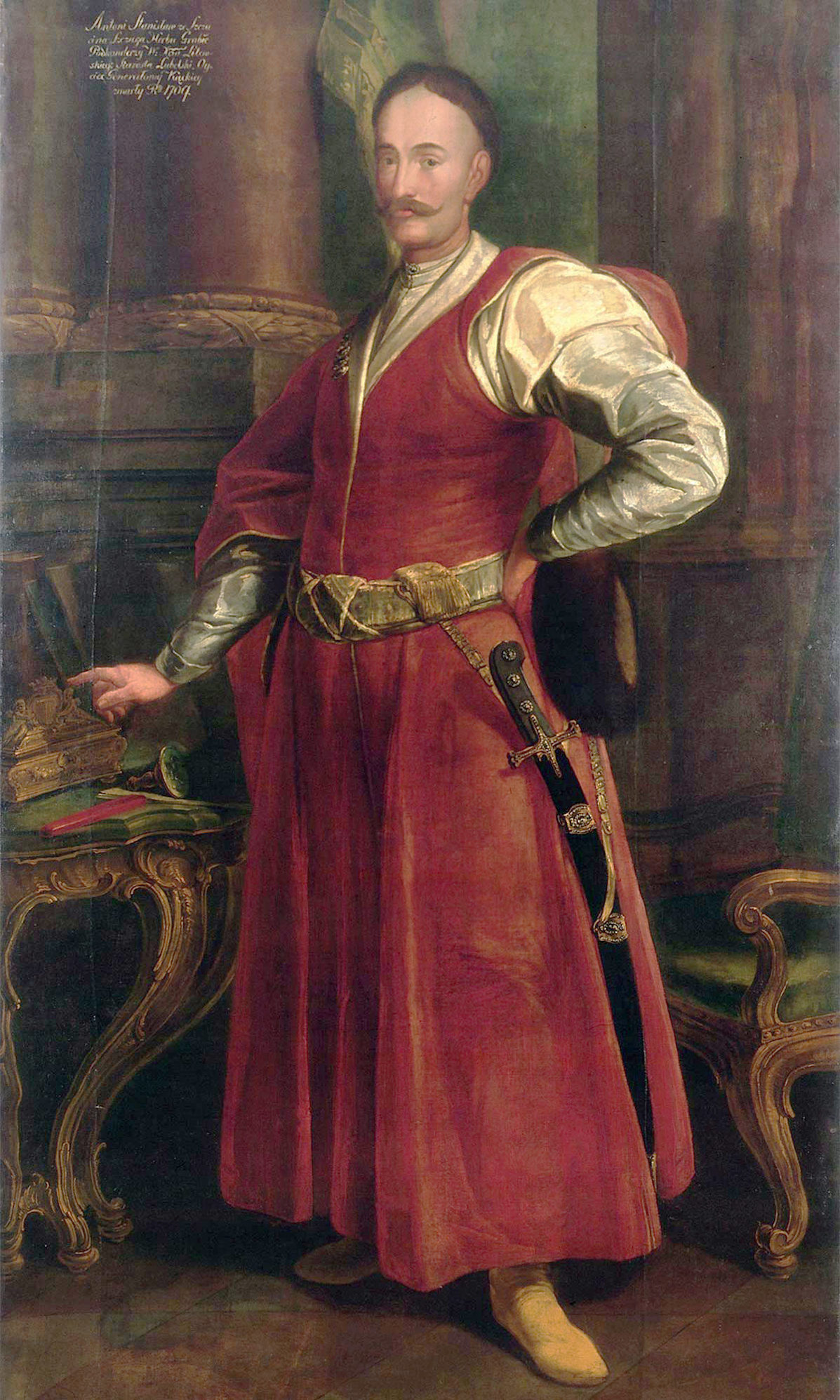
Stanisław Antoni Szczuka in Sarmatian attire, wearing a kontusz

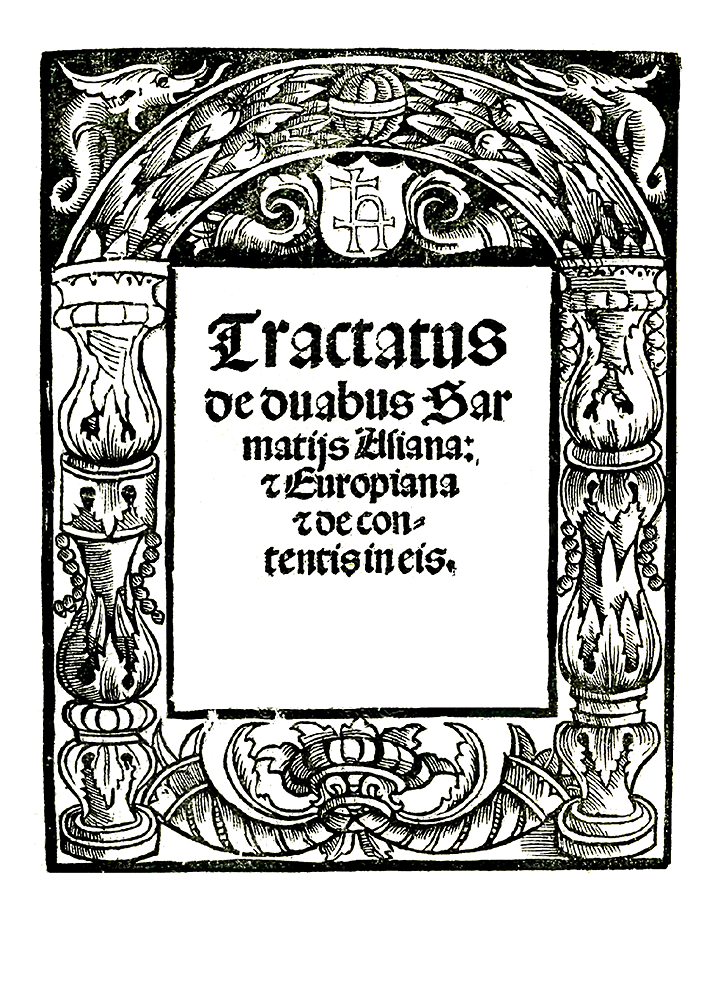
"Treatise about two Sarmatia Asian and European and about their composition" by Maciej Miechowita (1517)

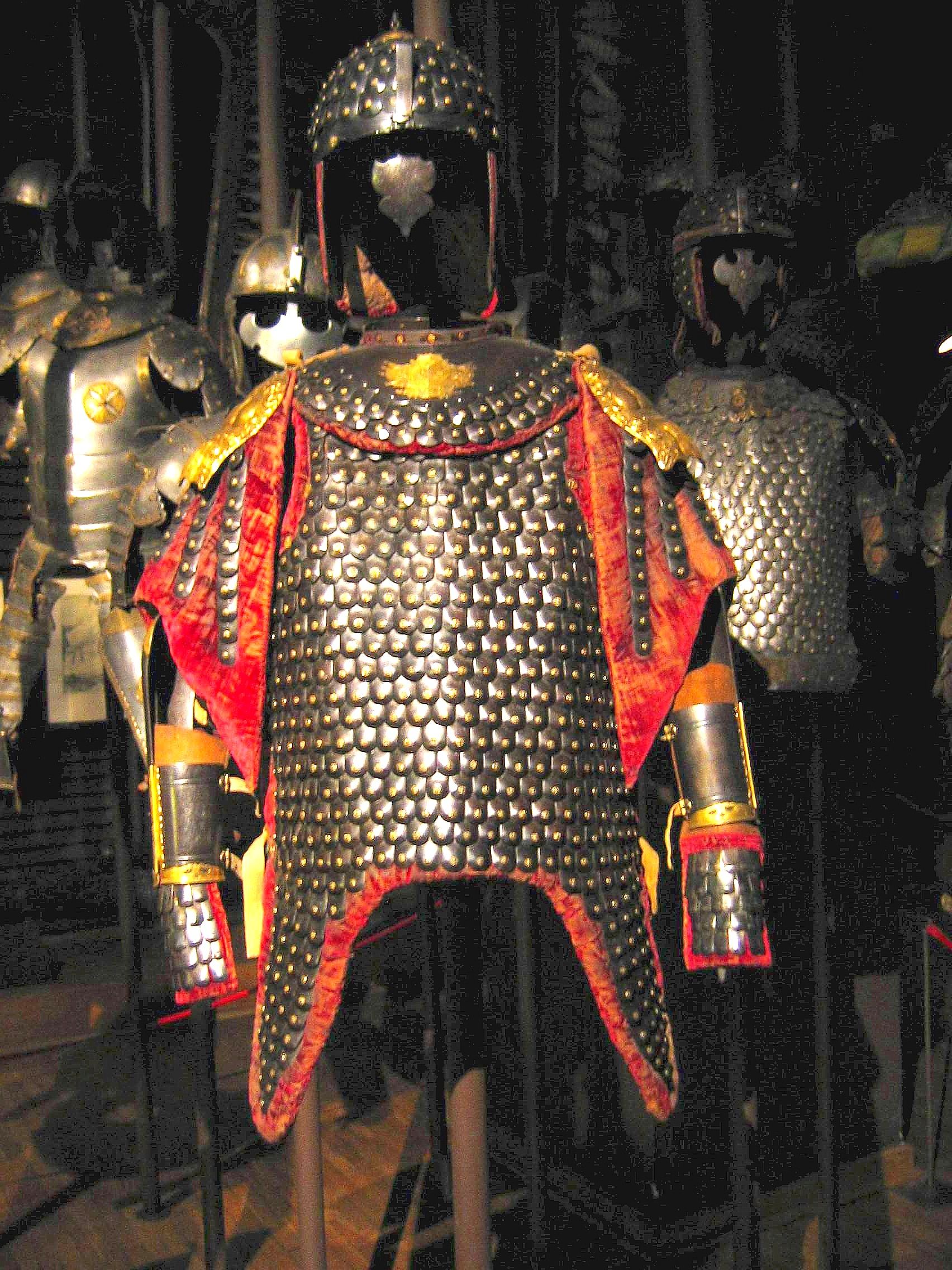
Sarmatian-style Karacena armor

Sarmatism (or Sarmatianism; Polish: Sarmatyzm) was an ethno-cultural identity within the Polish–Lithuanian Commonwealth. It was the dominant Baroque culture and ideology of the nobility (szlachta) that existed in the time from the Renaissance to the early 18th century. Together with the concept of "Golden Liberty", it formed a central aspect of the Commonwealth social elites’ culture and society. At its core was the unifying belief that the nobles of the Polish–Lithuanian Commonwealth descended from the ancient Iranic Sarmatians, the legendary invaders of contemporary Polish and Roman lands in antiquity.

The term and culture were reflected primarily in 17th-century Polish literature, as in Jan Chryzostom Pasek's memoirs and the poems of Wacław Potocki. The Polish gentry wore a long coat, called kontusz, knee-high boots, and carried a szabla (sabre), usually a karabela. Moustaches were also popular, as well as decorative feathers in men's headgear. Poland's "Sarmatians" strove to achieve martial skill on horseback, believed in equality among themselves, and in invincibility in the face of the enemy. Sarmatism lauded past victories of the Polish military, and required Polish noblemen to cultivate the tradition.

Sarmatia (Polish: Sarmacja) was a semi-legendary, poetic name for Poland that was fashionable into the 18th century, and which designated qualities associated with the literate citizenry of the vast Polish–Lithuanian Commonwealth. Sarmatism greatly affected the culture, lifestyle and ideology of the Polish nobility. It was unique for its cultural mix of Oriental, Western and native traditions. Criticized during the Polish Enlightenment, Sarmatism was rehabilitated by the generations that embraced Polish Romanticism. Having survived the literary realism of Poland's "Positivist" period, Sarmatism made a comeback with The Trilogy of Henryk Sienkiewicz, Poland's first Nobel laureate in literature.

== Concept origin and its general idea ==
The term Sarmatism was first used by Jan Długosz in his 15th century work on the history of Poland. Długosz was also responsible for linking the Sarmatians to the prehistory of Poland and this idea was continued by other chroniclers and historians such as Stanisław Orzechowski, Marcin Bielski, Marcin Kromer, and Maciej Miechowita. Miechowita's Tractatus de Duabus Sarmatiis became influential abroad, where for some time it was one of the most widely used reference works on the Polish–Lithuanian Commonwealth. The idea appeared due to the humanists' romantic admiration of Antiquity and an attempt to return an outdated onomastics.

According to the Geography by Ptolemy, Sarmatia was considered to be territory of Poland, Lithuania, and Tartary and consisted of Asian and European parts divided by the Don River. As a geographical term, Sarmatia was always indistinct, but very stable. The presumed ancestors of the szlachta, the Sarmatians, were a confederacy of predominantly Iranian tribes living north of the Black Sea. In the 5th century BC Herodotus wrote that these tribes were descendants of the Scythians and Amazons. The Sarmatians were infiltrated by the Goths and others in the 2nd century AD, and may have had some strong and direct links to Poland. The legend of Polish descent from Sarmatians stuck and grew until most of those within the Commonwealth, and many abroad, believed that many Polish nobles were descendants of the Sarmatians (Sauromates). Another tradition came to surmise that the Sarmatians themselves were descended from Japheth, son of Noah.

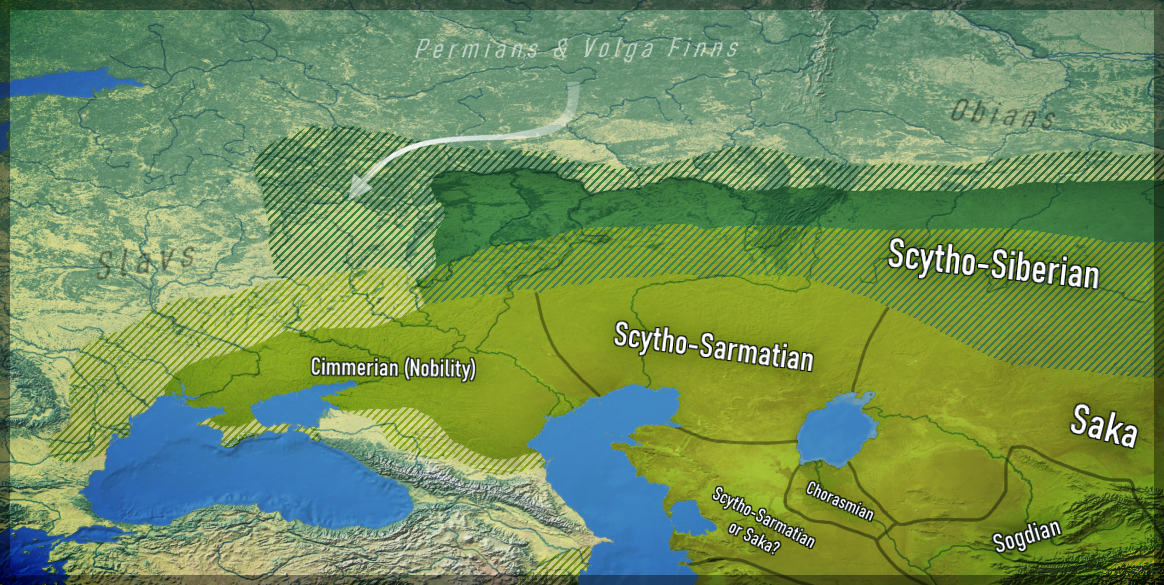
Sarmatians, westernmost of the Iranic peoples.

Some holding to Sarmatism tended to believe that their ancestors had conquered and enserfed the local Slavs and, like the Bulgars in Bulgaria or Franks who conquered Gaul (France), eventually adopted the local language. Such nobility might believe that they belonged (at least figuratively) to a different people than the Slavs whom they ruled. "Roman maps, fashioned during the Renaissance, had the name of Sarmatia written over most of the territory of the Polish–Lithuanian Commonwealth, and thus 'justified' interest in 'Sarmatian roots'."

Centuries later, modern scholarship discovered evidence showing that the Alans, a late Sarmatian people speaking an Iranian idiom, did invade Slavic tribes in Eastern Europe before the sixth century, and that these "Sarmatians evidently formed the area's ruling class, which was gradually Slavicized." Their direct political connection to Poland, however, would remain somewhat uncertain. In his 1970 publication The Sarmatians (in the series "Ancient Peoples and Places") Tadeusz Sulimirski (1898–1983), an Anglo-Polish historian, archaeologist, and researcher on the ancient Sarmatians, discusses the abundant evidence of the ancient Sarmatian presence in Eastern Europe, e.g., the finds of various grave goods such as pottery, weapons, and jewelry. Possible ethnological and social influences on the Polish szlachta would include tamga-inspired heraldry, social organization, military practices, and burial customs.

Sarmatism was used to integrate the Lithuanian and Ruthenian nobles into the Polish-Lithuanian Commonwealth, and also elevated Ukrainian Cossacks as part of this identity despite their non-noble status. Historian Karin Friedrich points out, from the writings of Commonwealth scholars Christoph Hartknoch and Thomas Clagius, that the German-speaking Protestant burghers of Royal Prussia also identified themselves with the ideology of Sarmatism, in particular, with its values of liberty, which they contrasted with Swedish or Imperial (German) identities which they associated with tyranny. Hartknoch claimed that "one European Sarmatia, as one common mother, nurtured the Poles and Lithuanians and Prussians," while Clagius wrote of many nations "diverse in customs, but all by origin from [Sarmatia]."

Poles tracing their descent to the Sarmatians was part of wider tendency evident all over Europe, of various peoples tracing their descent to an ancient people who had lived in their country in Roman times: the Dutch taking up the Batavians as their forebears, the French—the Gauls, the Portuguese—the Lusitanians, the Scots—the Caledonians, the Swiss—the Helvetii, the Romanians—the Dacians, the Bulgarians—the Thracians, the Albanians—the Illyrians, the Slovenes—the Veneti, the Hungarians—the Huns, etc.

== Culture ==
Sarmatian belief and customs became an important part of szlachta culture, penetrating all aspects of life. Sarmatism emphasized equality among all szlachta, and celebrated their life style and traditions, including horseback riding, provincial village life, and relative peace.

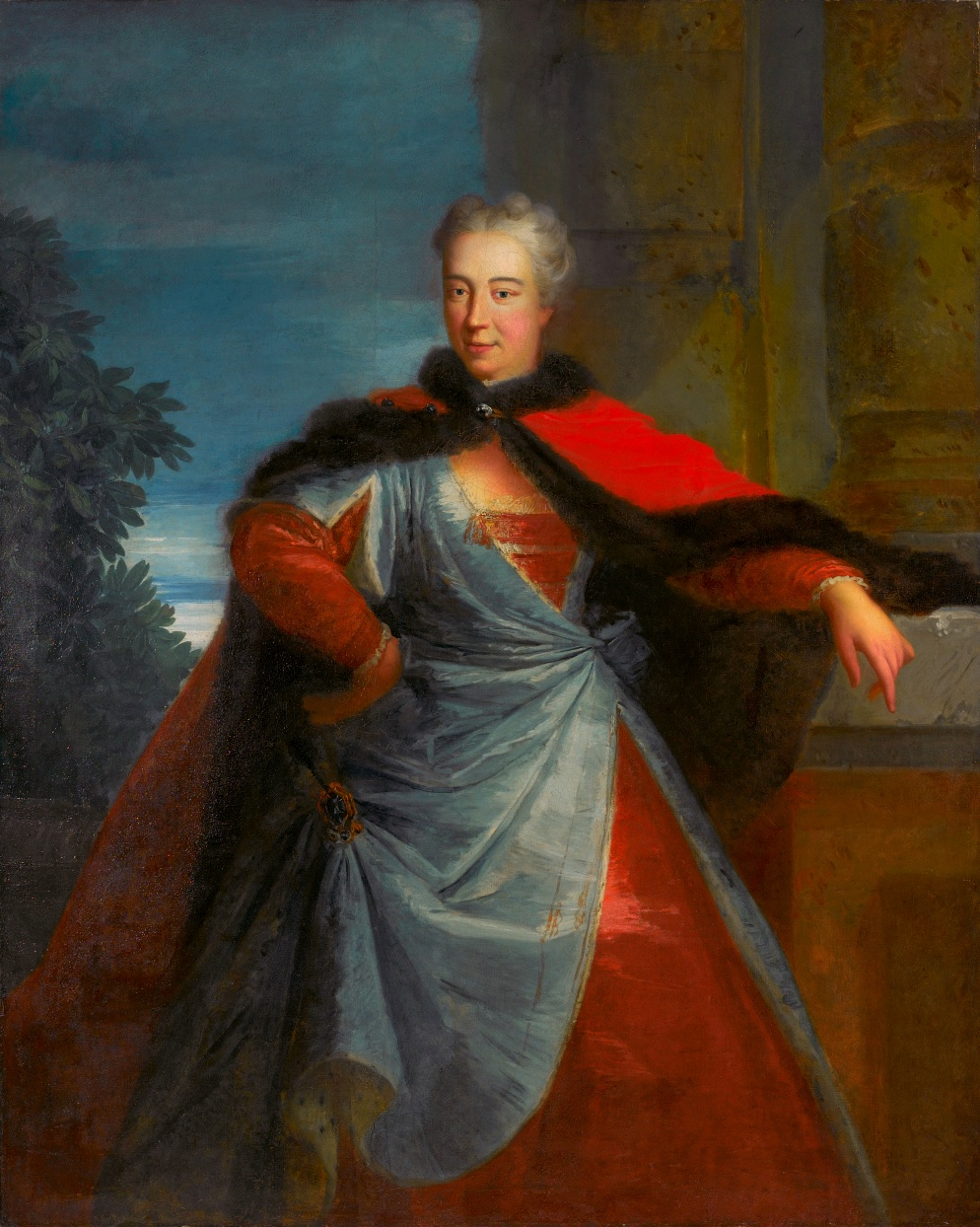
Politically influential Elżbieta Sieniawska, in Sarmatist pose and male delia coat

Sarmatists strongly valued social and family ties, and considered honour and gallantry towards women as important.

At the same time women were expected to spend the majority of their time at home, often living in separate quarters. Sarmatian women were barred from leaving their home unescorted. In the east of the Commonwealth, this extended to further social segregation of the sexes akin to the purdah.

Szlachta were expected to show familiarity with all other szlachta. This camaraderie did not extend to other nations, social classes and cultures which the Sarmatians viewed as inferior to their own. Poland's wars with other countries and the election of foreign monarchs to the Polish throne who prioritised their personal goals over those of the state, only strengthened those sentiments.

Conversation was one of their favourite occupations. Hospitality towards guests – relatives, friends, even strangers, especially from abroad, was also one of the Sarmatist values. Sarmatist culture also valued the hosting of sumptuous feasts with large amounts of alcohol. Male quarrels and fighting during such events was quite common. At their parties the polonaise, mazurka, and oberek were the most popular dances. A heightened self-esteem culture of honour was considered to be of prime importance, in which noblemen were expected to show eagerness to fight against anyone who infringed on his "rights" and show personal courage by bearing scars — sometimes hiring barbers to create scars. Marriage was described as 'deep friendship'. Men often travelled a lot (to the Sejms, Sejmiki, indulgences, law courts, or common movements). Women stayed at home and took care of the property, livestock and children. Girls and boys were brought up separately, either in the company of women or men. Suing, even for relatively irrelevant matters, was common, but in cases a compromise was reached. Sarmatism also expected nobility to show contempt for entrepreneurship, which was instead associated with Jewish people, and all labour activity. Among the Sarmatians, Latin was widely spoken, although at a superficial level. Starting from the 17th century, schools modeled after those of the Jesuits became common. Xenophobic attitudes led to the fall of educational standards among the gentry, as foreign ideas were seen as subversive.

Funeral ceremonies in Sarmatist Poland were very elaborate, with some distinctive features compared to other parts of Europe. They were carefully planned events, full of ceremony and splendour. Elaborate preparations were made in the period between a nobleman's death and his funeral, which employed a large number of craftsmen, architects, decorators, servants and cooks. Sometimes many months passed before all the preparations were completed. Before the burial, the coffin with the corpse was placed in a church amid the elaborate architecture of the castrum doloris ("castle of mourning"). Heraldic shields, which were placed on the sides of the coffin, and a tin sheet with an epitaph served a supplementary role and provided information about the deceased person. Religious celebrations were usually preceded by a procession which ended in the church. It was led by a horseman who played the role of the deceased nobleman and wore his armour. This horseman would enter the church and fall off his horse with a tremendous bang and clank, showing in this way the triumph of death over earthly might and knightly valour. Some funeral ceremonies lasted for as long as four days, ending with a wake which had little to do with the seriousness of the situation, and could easily turn into sheer revelry. Occasionally an army of clergy took part in the burial (in the 18th century, 10 bishops, 60 canons and 1705 priests took part in the funeral of one Polish nobleman).

== Fashion ==
Some Polish nobles felt that their supposed Sarmatian ancestors were a Turkic people and accordingly viewed their Turkish and Tatar enemies as peers, albeit ones who were unredeemed because they were not Christians. During the Baroque era in Poland, the art and furnishings of the Persians and the Chinese, as well as the Ottomans, were admired and displayed in separate chambers or rooms.

Sarmatism popularised Ottoman-styled clothing and attire for men, such as the żupan, kontusz, sukmana, pas kontuszowy, delia, and szabla. Thereby, it served to integrate the multiethnic nobility by creating an almost nationalist sense of unity and pride in the szlachta's political Golden Freedoms. It also differentiated the Polish szlachta from nobility in Western Europe.

In accordance with their views on their supposed Turkic origins, Sarmatists' costume stood out from that worn by the noblemen of other European countries, and had its roots in the Orient. It was long, dignified, rich and colourful. One of its most characteristic elements was the kontusz, which was worn with the decorative kontusz belt. Underneath, the żupan was worn, and over the żupan the delia. Clothes for the mightiest families were crimson and scarlet. The szarawary were typical lower-body clothing, and the calpac, decorated with heron's feathers, was worn on the head. French fashions, however, also contributed to the Sarmatian look in Polish attire.

The żupan was derived from the Turkish long garment dżubbah, the outer garment kontusz from the Turkish kontosz, the kołpak, a hat with a brooch, came from the Turkish kalpak and the high leather boots baczmagi was derived from the Turkish Baczmak. The oriental-patterned kontusz sash, which originally had to be imported from the Ottomans and Persia, became the most distinctive element of 17th century Polish clothing. Noblemen always wore a curved sabre, which was based on Ottoman-style sabres, while military commanders carried a baton or mace with a turquoise-encrusted gold or silver head (bulawa or buzdygan, based on the Turkish bozdogan), which was considered lucky in the Islamic world.

== Political thought and institutions ==
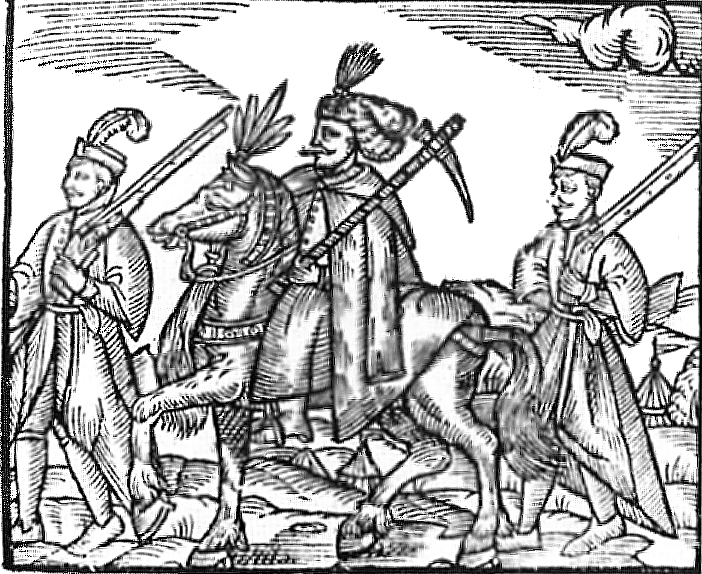
Polish nobleman and two hajduk guards.

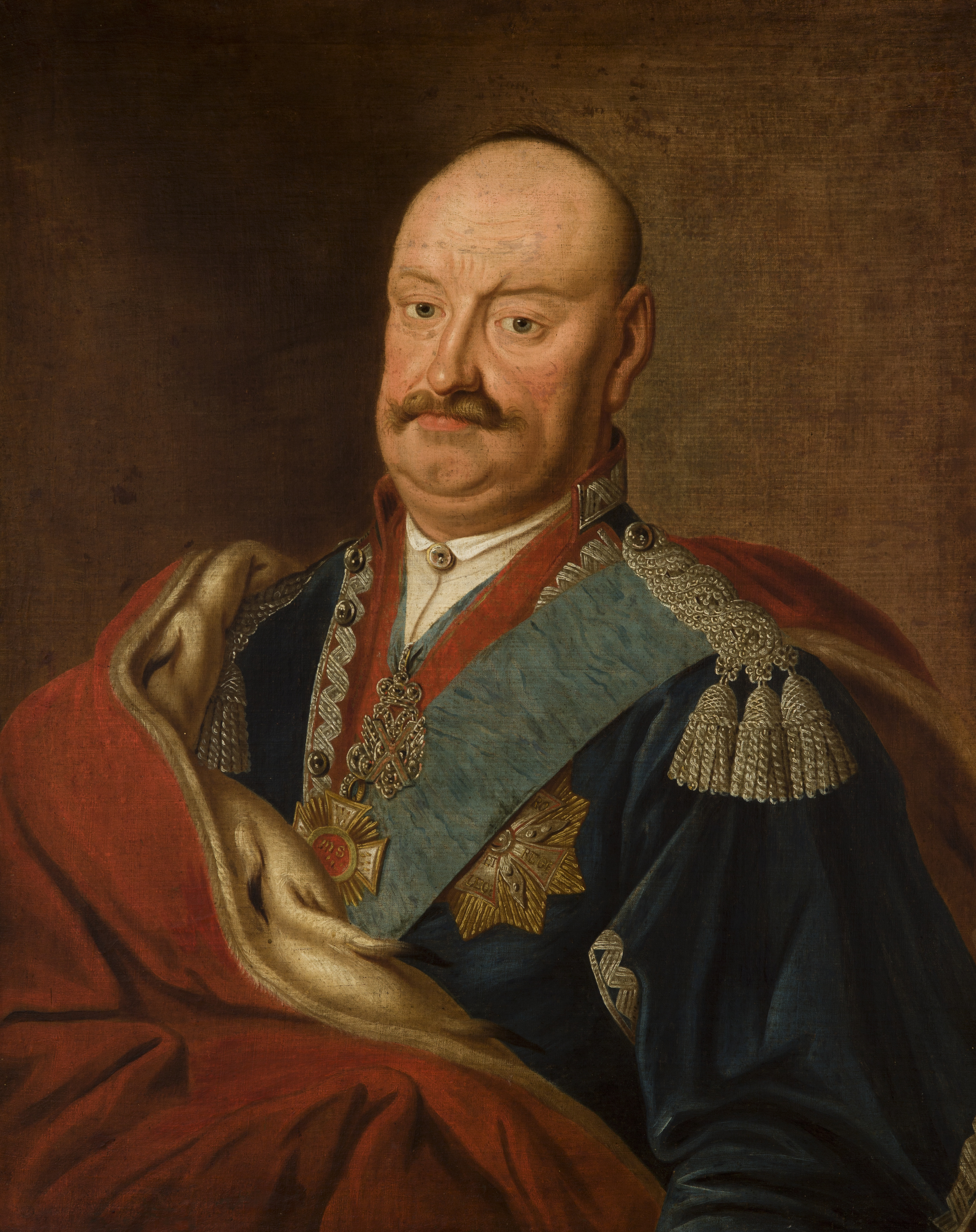
Karol Stanisław Radziwiłł, the most prominent nobleman of his times and a representative of Sarmatism.

Adherents of Sarmatism acknowledged the vital importance of Poland since it was considered an oasis of the Golden Liberty for Polish nobility, otherwise surrounded by antagonistic realms with absolutist governments. They also viewed Poland as the bulwark of true Christendom, almost surrounded by the Muslim Ottoman Empire, and by the errant Christianity of the Orthodox Russians and the Protestant Germans and Swedes.

What contemporary Polish historians consider to be one of the most essential features of this tradition is not Sarmatist ideology, but the manner in which the Rzeczpospolita was governed. The democratic concepts of law and order, self-government and elective offices constituted an inseparable part of Sarmatism. Yet it was democracy only for the few. The king, though elected, still held the central position in the state, but his power was limited by various legal acts and requirements. Moreover, only the nobles were given political rights, namely the vote in the Sejmik and the Sejm. The idea of unamity that had already developed in the 15th century Sejms of Poland was later abused following the demoralisation of the times of the Deluge, which left the Rzeczpospolita depopulated and looted. Beginning with Siciński's veto, every poseł (or member of the Sejm), had the right to exercise a now so-called liberum veto, which could block the passage of a proposed new resolution or law. Finally, in the event that the king failed to abide by the laws of the state, or tried to limit or question nobles' privileges, they had the right to refuse the king's commands, and to oppose him by force of arms. Although thus avoiding absolutist rule, unfortunately the central state power became precarious, and vulnerable to anarchy.

The political system of the Rzeczpospolita was regarded by the nobility as the best in the world, and the Polish Sejm as (factually) the oldest. The system was frequently compared to Republican Rome and to the Greek polis – though each of these eventually surrendered to imperial rule or to tyrants. The Henrician Articles were considered to be the foundation of the system. Every attempt to infringe on these laws was treated as a great crime.

Yet despite fruits of golden age Poland and the Sarmatist culture, the country would enter a period of national decline; it brought in a narrow cultural conformity. Nonetheless, a crippling political anarchy came to reign, due to cynical use of the free veto by individual szlachta in the Sejm, and/or to the acts of unpatriotic kings. During the late eighteenth century, the woeful state of the polity resulted in the three Polish Partitions by neighboring military powers.

"Was the Sarmatian way of life worth preserving? Some aspects of it, no doubt. But because the gentry insisted on jealously guarding its privileges, preventing their extension to other social groups, it doomed the structure of the Commonwealth to atrophy and to the revenge of the lower orders. ... Sarmatism was an ideological shield against the historical realities which contradicted it at every turn."

Since its original popularity among the former szlachta, Sarmatism itself went into political decline. It has since seen revision and revival, followed by eclipse.

== Religion ==
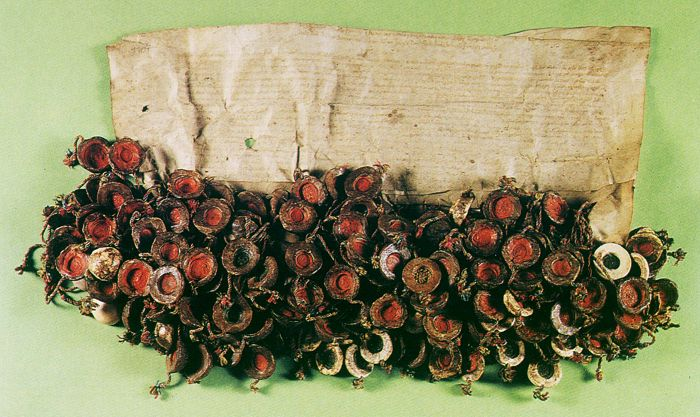
Original act of the Warsaw Confederation 1573, the second act of religious freedom in Europe, after the 1568 Edict of Torda

"Certainly, the wording and substance of the declaration of the Confederation of Warsaw of 28 January 1573 were extraordinary with regard to prevailing conditions elsewhere in Europe, and they governed the principles of religious life in the Republic for over two hundred years" – Norman Davies.

Poland has a long tradition of religious freedom. The right to worship freely was a basic right given to all inhabitants of the Commonwealth throughout the 15th and early 16th centuries, and complete freedom of religion was officially recognized in Poland in 1573 during the Warsaw Confederation. Poland maintained its religious freedom laws during an era when religious persecution was an everyday occurrence in the rest of Europe. The Commonwealth of Poland was a place where the most radical religious sects, trying to escape persecution in other countries of the Christian world, sought refuge.

"This country became a place of shelter for heretics" –Cardinal Stanislaus Hosius, papal legate to Poland.

In the sphere of religion, Catholicism was the dominant faith and heavily emphasized because it was seen as differentiating the Polish Sarmatists from their Turkish and Tatar peers. Providence and the grace of God were often emphasized. All earthly matters were perceived as a means to a final goal – Heaven. Penance was stressed as a means of saving oneself from eternal punishment. It was believed that God watches over everything and everything has its meaning. People willingly took part in religious life: masses, indulgences and pilgrimages. Special devotion was paid to Saint Mary, the saints and the Passion.

Towards the end of the 16th century, Sarmatian religious ceremonies became increasingly elaborate. It became common for the gentry to weep, loudly suspire and call out Saint Mary's name during prayer, in what was seen as a religious revival. The Counter-Reformation, contributed to the rise of religious intolerance among the szlachta. War with Protestant Sweden facilitated the persecution of non-Catholics. In 1658, Arians were banished from the Commonwealth. Ten years later the Sejm outlawed the conversion from Catholicism to other faiths. Catholicism thus became entrenched as the religion of the Sarmatians.

Muslim Tatar nobles within the Polish Lithuanian Commonwealth were also integrated into the same Sarmatian ideology but with a different pedigree; they were seen as parts of the Sarmatian 'nation' but rather than being descended from Sarmatians, they were regarded as descendants of the related Scythians, another ancient steppe warrior culture.

== Sarmatist art and writings ==
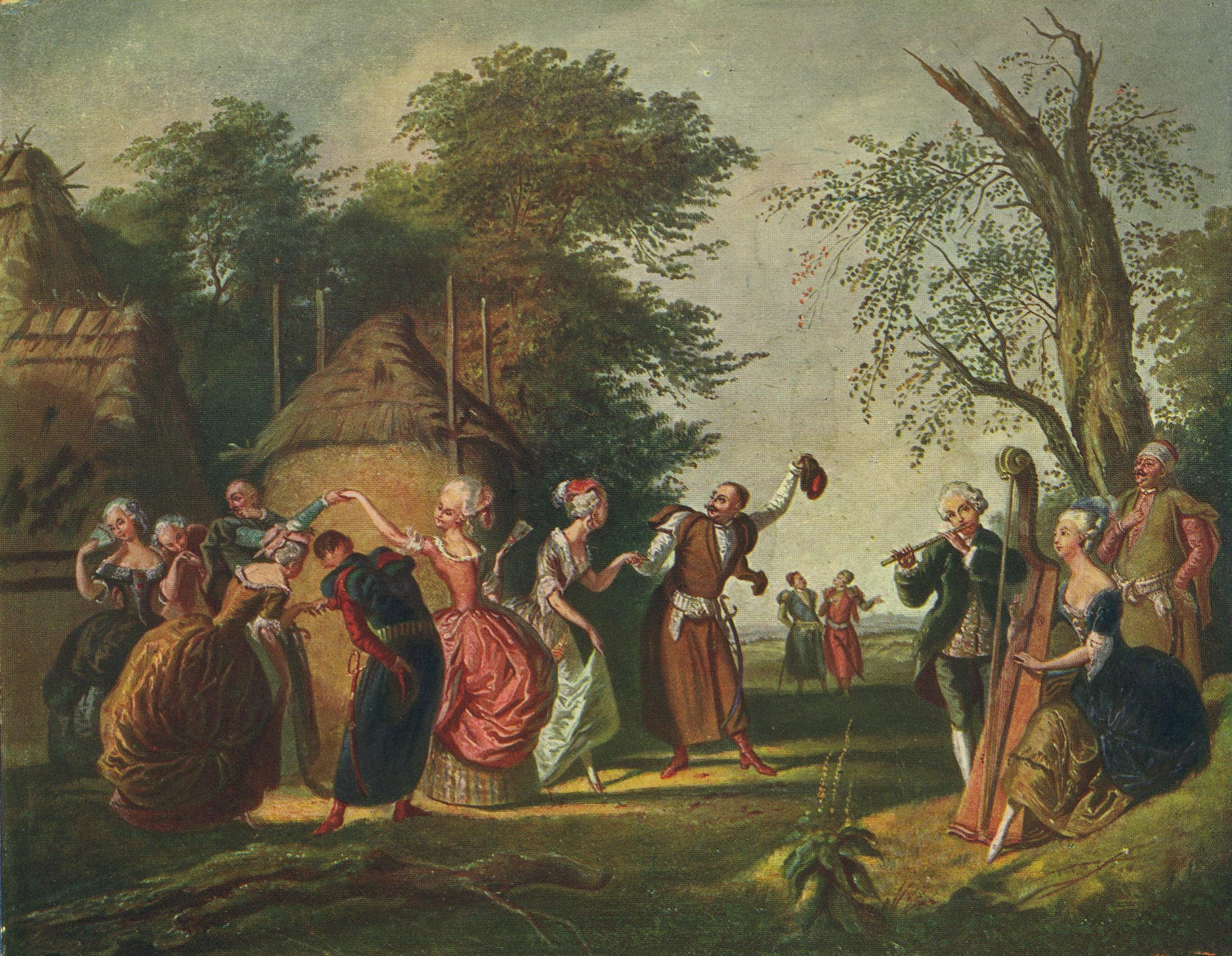
Poles dance the Polonaise (painting by Kornelli Szlegel)

Art was treated by Sarmatists as propagandistic in function: its role was to immortalise a good name for the family, extolling the virtues of ancestors and their great deeds. Consequently, personal or family portraits were in great demand. Their characteristic features were realism, variety of colour and rich symbolism (epitaphs, coats of arms, military accessories). People were usually depicted against a subdued, dark background, in a three-quarter view.

Sarmatist culture was portrayed especially by:

- Wacław Potocki
- Jan Chryzostom Pasek
- Wespazjan Kochowski
- Andrzej Zbylitowski
- Hieronim Morsztyn
- Jan Andrzej Morsztyn
- Daniel Naborowski
- Justus Ludwik Decjusz

Latin was very popular and often mixed with the Polish language in macaronic writings and in speech. Knowing at least some Latin was an obligation for any szlachcic.

In the 19th century the Sarmatist culture of the Polish–Lithuanian Commonwealth was portrayed and popularised by Henryk Sienkiewicz in his trilogy (Ogniem i Mieczem, Potop, Pan Wolodyjowski). In the 20th century, Sienkiewicz's trilogy was filmed, and Sarmatist culture became the subject of many modern books (by Jacek Komuda and others), songs (like that of Jacek Kaczmarski) and even role-playing games like Dzikie Pola.

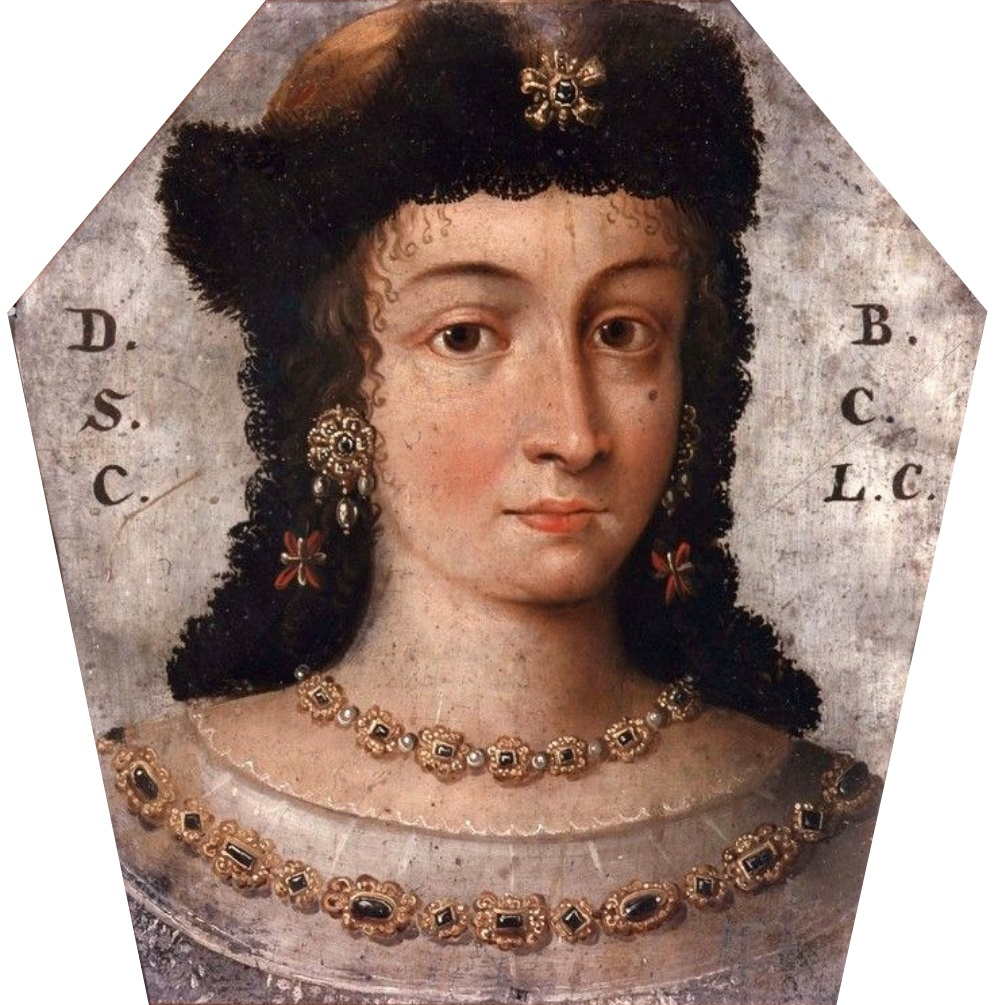
Coffin portrait of Barbara Lubomirska, 1676.

One of the most distinctive art forms of the Sarmatists was the coffin portraits, a form of portraiture characteristic of Polish Baroque painting, not to be found anywhere else in Europe. The octagonal or hexagonal portraits were fixed to the headpiece of the coffin so that the deceased person, being a Christian with an immortal soul, was always represented as alive and capable of holding a dialogue with mourners during lavish funeral celebrations. Such portraits were props which evoked the illusion of the dead person's presence, and also a ritual medium that provided a link between the living and those departing for eternity. The few surviving portraits, often painted during a person's lifetime, are a dependable source of information about 17th-century Polish nobility. The dead were depicted either in their official clothes or in travelling garb, since death was believed to be a journey into the unknown. The oldest known coffin portrait in Poland is that depicting Stefan Batory, dating from the end of the 16th century.

Many of the szlachta residences were provincial mansions, with a mansard roof. Numerous palaces and churches were built in Sarmatist Poland. There was a trend towards native architectural solutions which were characterised by Gothic forms and unique stucco ornamentation of vaults. Gravestones and epitaphs were erected in churches for those who had rendered considerable services for the motherland. Tens of thousands of manor houses were built across the Commonwealth. At the entrance there was a porch or a loggia. The central place where visitors were received was a large entrance hall. In the manor house there was an intimate part for women, and a more public one for men. Manor houses often had corner annexes. Walls were adorned with portraits of ancestors, mementos and spoils. Few of the manor houses from the Old Polish period have survived, but their tradition was continued in the 19th and 20th century.

== Hairstyle and moustache ==
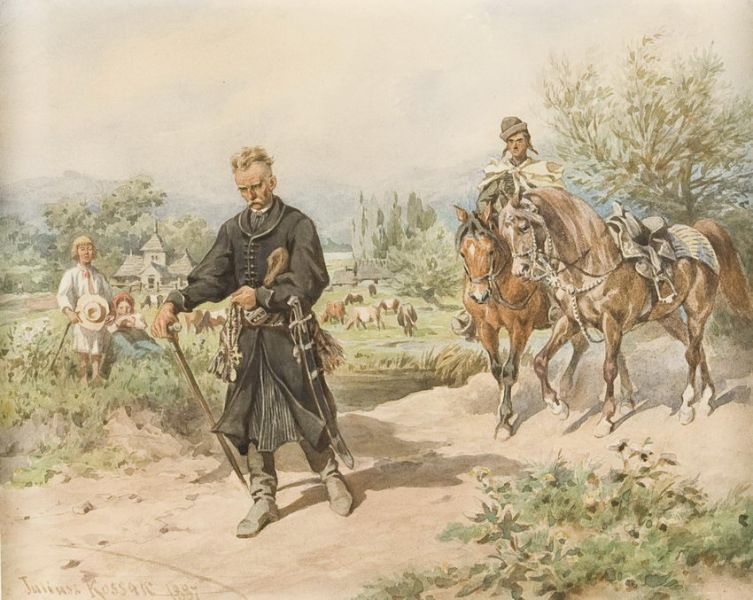
The Pilgrimage of the Last of Nieczujas, 1887. The nobleman has the characteristic czupryna haircut

The writer and poet Mikołaj Rej (Nicholas Rey) recounts that "some people shave their beards and wear a moustache, some trim their beards in Czech style, others trim in Spanish style. There is also a difference around the moustache, some men are stroking it down, other men are brushing up. The nobility of the Sarmatian era did not have a beard and instead preferred a moustache, which became an indispensable attribute of a knightly face. Those who wore beards were said to be German". Jan Karol Chodkiewicz and Jan Zamoyski shaved their heads around, leaving a high tuft of hair above their forehead. This tuft was reportedly introduced in Poland by Samuel Łaszcz, who was the first to wear such a hairstyle. Only elderly senators had to wear a sumptuous beard, which was an expression of their high dignity or wisdom, as was the case in most European countries. The hairstyles and facial hair of the Polish nobility were also explicitly described by Giovanni Francesco Commendone who wrote that "some Poles have their heads shaved, others have clean-cut hair, many have hair, some have long beards, others are shaved apart from moustaches. The Polish Sarmatian custom of shaving their heads except for a small wisp of hair on the scalp was derived from Turkic-Tatar custom.

== Modern usage ==
In contemporary Polish, the word "Sarmatian" (Polish: Sarmata- when used as noun, sarmacki- when used as adjective) is a form of ironic self-identification, and is sometimes used as a synonym for the Polish character.

A scholarly journal on Poland, central and eastern Europe, was launched by Polish-Americans, published at Rice University and called the Sarmatian Review.

== Impact ==
Lithuanians and Ruthenians living within the Commonwealth also adopted certain aspects of Sarmatism. Some Lithuanian historians of that time claimed that their people were descended from Scythians who had settled in ancient Rome, which had become the home of their pagan high priest.

When writing on the history of Russia, 18th century Russian scholar Mikhail Lomonosov also borrowed Sarmatism from the Polish to explain the origin of the Slavic people of Russia. In his view, Russia's Slavs were descended from Sarmatians while Finns were descended from Scythians, and that Finno-Ugric and Slavic peoples mixed to form Russians. Lomonosov's argument sparked off the Anti-Normanism movement in East Slavic historical studies.

== Evaluation ==
Sarmatism, which evolved during the Polish Renaissance and entrenched itself during the Polish baroque, found itself opposed to the ideology of the Polish Enlightenment. By the late-18th century the word 'Sarmatism' had gained negative associations and the concept was frequently criticized and ridiculed in political publications such as Monitor, where it became a synonym for uneducated and unenlightened ideas and a derogatory term for those who opposed the reforms of the "progressives" such as the king, Stanisław August Poniatowski (r. 1764–1795). The ideology of Sarmatism became a target for ridicule, as seen in Franciszek Zabłocki's play "Sarmatism" (Sarmatyzm, 1785).

To a certain degree the process reversed during the period of Polish Romanticism, when after the partitions of Poland (1772 to 1795) memory of the old Polish Golden Age rehabilitated old traditions to a certain extent. Particularly in the aftermath of the November Uprising of 1830 to 1831, when the genre of gawęda szlachecka ("a nobleman's tale"), shaped by Henryk Rzewuski, gained popularity, Sarmatism was often portrayed positively in literature. Such treatment of the concept can also be seen in Polish messianism and in works of great Polish poets like Adam Mickiewicz (Pan Tadeusz, 1834), Juliusz Słowacki and Zygmunt Krasiński, as well as of novelists (Henryk Sienkiewicz in his Trylogia of 1884 to 1888), and others. This close connection between Polish Romanticism and Polish history became one of the defining qualities of this period in Polish literature, differentiating it from the work of other contemporary writers, who - unlike the Poles - did not suffer from a lack of national statehood.

== See also ==
- Baroque in Poland
- Polish–Lithuanian Commonwealth § Culture
- Szlachta § Szlachta culture
- Khazarism
- Cavalier myth, a similar phenomenon in the Antebellum United States
