= Komes (Poland) =

Komes (abbreviated K. before a surname), also żupan in Polish, a title developed from the Latin comes in medieval Poland and was used for dignitary in the period of the Holy Roman Empire for administrative and military district commanders. The title faded from use before the establishment of the Polish–Lithuanian Commonwealth to be replaced by kasztelan.

== See also ==
- Baron
- Count
- Polish nobility
