= Bekiesza =

Type of fur-lined overcoat

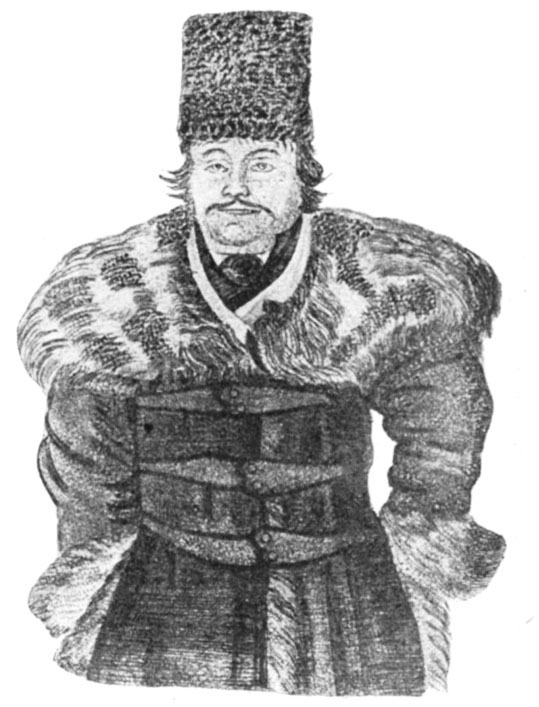
Bekiesza

Bekiesza or bekesha (Russian: бекеша) is a historical kind of fur-lined overcoat popularized in Poland in 16th century under the influence of Hungarian culture. Originally it was knee-length coat loose enough to be worn over other outer garments (żupan or kontusz), trimmed with prominent frog fastening, narrowly fit at the waist and with a slit in the back.

== Etymology ==
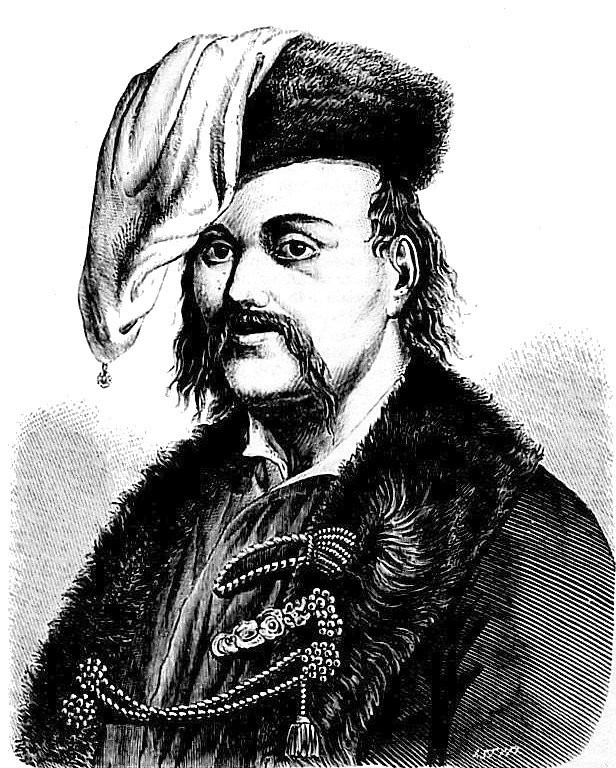
Gáspár Bekes, the namesake

This kind of coat was worn, in particular, by a Hungarian nobleman in service of the Kingdom of Poland, Gáspár Bekes (Kasper Bekiesz), whom the coat was named after. Originally it was named 'bekieszka', created from the surname with the suffix of attribution '-ka', similar to other kinds of attire (Radziwiłł: radziwiłka, konfederat: konfederatka, etc.). Claims that the word is derived from Hungarian 'bekes', 'bekecs' are questionalble, because the latter words are attested to much later times, therefore most likely they are Polonisms in Hungarian language.

== History ==
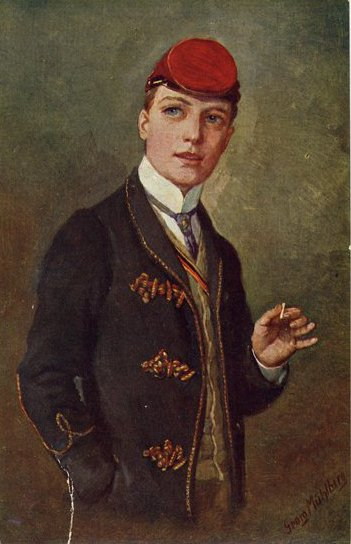
"Im ersten Semester" by Georg Mühlberg

Bekieszes gradually went out of fashion as an element of the wealthy szlachta attire and were adopted by commoners and town folk. Peasants had bekieszes with woolen ribbons; petty szlachta used bekieszes made of low-quality fur of brown hare (called "grey hare" in Polish (szarak); therefore one of the derisive epithets for petty szlacha was szaraczki).

In 19th century bekieszes in the form of jackets regained popularity as an element of elegant male attire.

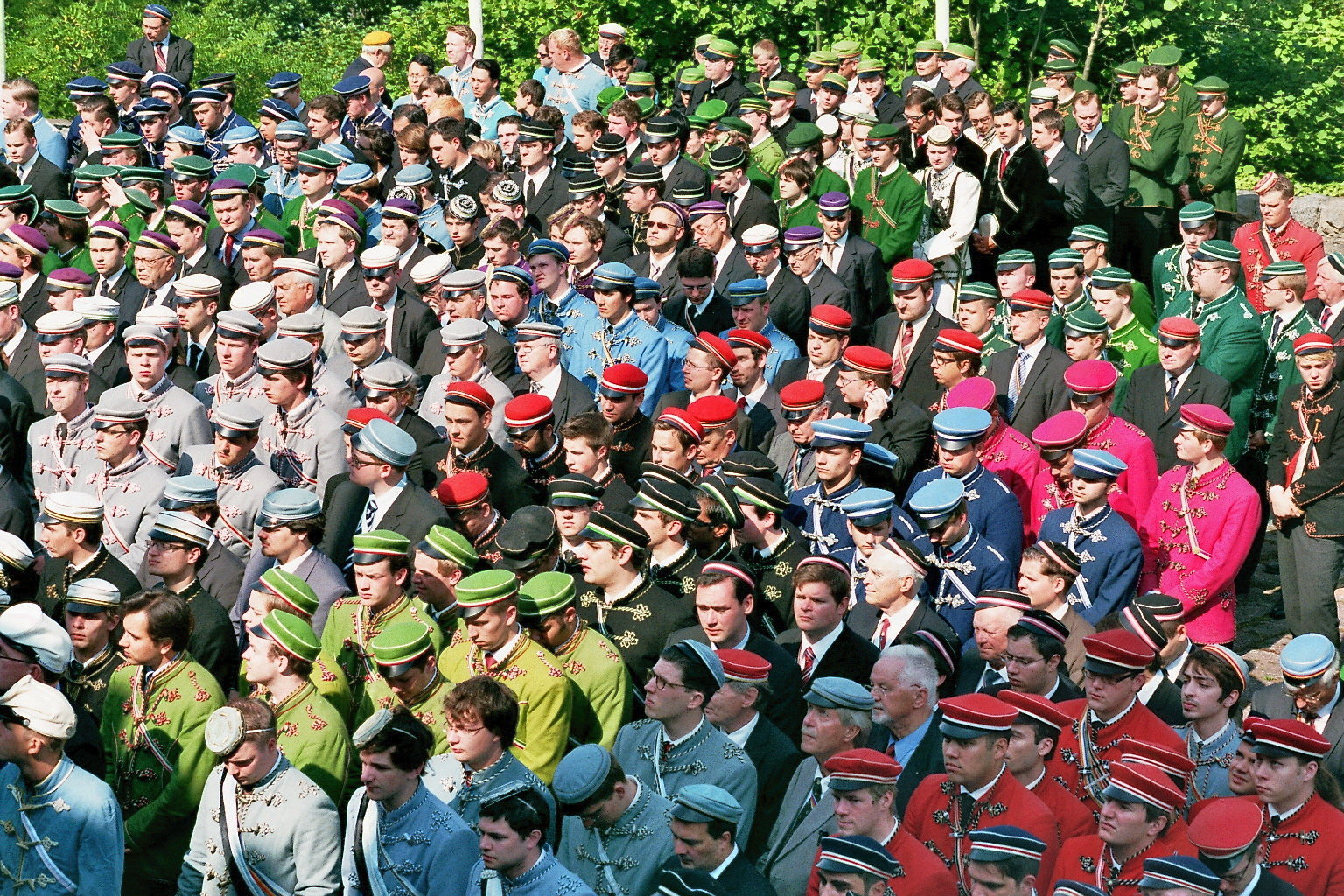
Korps parade, 2011

In Germany, Pekesche is part of the festive attire of some student corporations (fraternities).

The coat was also known in Russia, called "bekesha".

The word was adopted for the name of the Jewish attire called bekishe.
