= Gáspár Bekes =

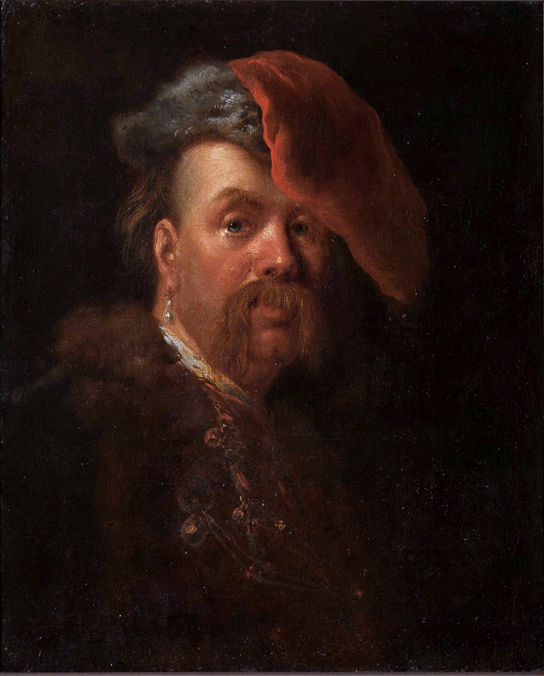
imagined portrait of Bekes attributed to Alexis Grimou c. 1730

Gáspár Bekes de Kornyát (also Gáspár de Corniath Bekes, Kornyáti Bekes Gáspár, or Kaspar Bekes, Caspar Bekesh; 1520 – 7 November 1579) was a Hungarian nobleman who fought Stephen Báthory for the throne of Transylvania after the death of John II Sigismund Zápolya in 1571. Allied with Maximilian II, Holy Roman Emperor, and the Székelys, Bekes organized two rebellions against Báthory, but was defeated. After Báthory became King of Poland and Grand Duke of Lithuania in 1576, Bekes reconciled with Báthory, becoming his close adviser. Bekes also fought in the Danzig rebellion and the Livonian War.

== Rivalry with Báthory ==
Coat of arms of Bekes

Bekes was treasurer for John II Sigismund Zápolya, King of Hungary (died 1571), and gained considerable power and favor with him. In his testament, Zápolya, who had no legal heir, designated Bekes as Voivode of Transylvania. However, the Hungarian nobles did not honor the will and elected Stephen Báthory as their voivode while Bekes was away on a diplomatic mission in the court of Maximilian II, Holy Roman Emperor. Supported by Maximilian, who opposed Báthory for the throne of the Polish–Lithuanian Commonwealth, Bekes gathered his army and organized a rebellion against Báthory, but was defeated. Bekes lost all of his possessions and was forced to seek asylum with Maximilian in Vienna. When Poland–Lithuania elected Henry of Valois as its monarch, Maximilian and Báthory ceased hostilities. Bekes unsuccessfully traveled to the Ottoman Empire seeking allies. His hopes were revived again when in 1574 Henry of Valois abdicated the Polish throne for that of France and the Maximilian–Báthory rivalry resumed. Bekes, supported by Székelys, started another rebellion, but his forces were defeated in the Battle of Kerelőszentpál in 1575. Supporters of Bekes were brutally suppressed and privileges for the Székelys were suspended.

== Service to Báthory and death ==
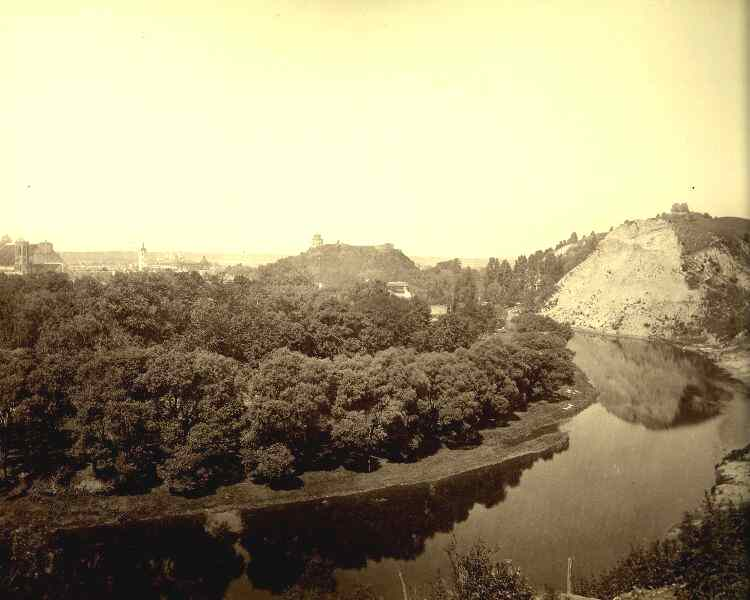
Remains of Bekes Hill (on the right) before it was washed away entirely

In 1576, Báthory was elected and crowned a King of Poland and later became a Grand Duke of Lithuania (the nobility in Lithuania were at first reluctant to Bathory and preferred Maximilian II, Holy Roman Emperor), thus becoming the ruler of the Polish–Lithuanian Commonwealth. Maximilian died in 1576, and Bekes lost any hopes of reclaiming Transylvania. Bekes decided to reconcile with Báthory and became his loyal ally and close adviser despite differences in their religions. During the Danzig rebellion, Bekes commanded Hungarian troops, sent to assist Báthory in establishing his control over the Commonwealth, and gained special recognition for his defense of Elbląg (Ebling). During the Livonian War against Ivan IV of Russia, Bekes joined the expedition to reconquer Polatsk (1579). For his service Báthory assigned him Lanckorona and other lands. On his way to Hrodna Bekes caught cold, fell ill, and died later in Hrodna. His body was transported to Vilnius for burial, but none of the city's Christian cemeteries agreed to accept him because of his Unitarian faith. Therefore, he was buried on a hill, which later became known as the Bekes Hill. His grave was marked by an octagonal tower, 20 metres (66 ft) in height and 6 metres (20 ft) in diameter. The hill and his grave were washed away by the Vilnia River in the mid-1800s. The territory is now within the Kalnai Park.

During this time Gáspár Bekes lent his name to the Polish overcoat called "bekiesza".
