= Russet (cloth) =

- Material type: Coarse cloth

Russet is a coarse cloth made of wool and dyed with woad and madder to give it a subdued grey or brown shade. By the statute of 1363, poor English people were required to wear russet or cheap blanket. Humble squires and priests, such as Franciscans wore russet as a sign of humility but preferred a good quality russet such as that made in Colchester, which was better than the cheapest cloth. The medieval poem Piers Plowman describes the virtuous Christian:

And is gladde of a goune of a graye russet
As of a tunicle of Tarse or of trye scarlet.

The ballad Of Patient Grissel and a Noble Marquess which was retold as Pamela, has the heroine's aristocratic clothes of silk and velvet contrasted with her "country russet" which again signifies rustic virtue. Oliver Cromwell wrote "I had rather have a plain russet-coated Captain ...than that which you call a Gentleman and is nothing else."

== See also ==
- Shoddy
- Sukmana
