= Hieronim Morsztyn =

Polish poet

Hieronim Morsztyn (1581–1623) was a Polish poet. He is known as one of the earliest poets of the Polish baroque and sarmatism. His most popular poem is Światowa Rozkosz (Worldly Pleasure).

Little is known about his life. Born in an Arian family to Florian Morsztyn and Zuzanna Łaska he was orphaned early and brought up by his uncle Samuel Łaski, the royal secretary. He attended a Jesuit college in Braniewo. During his later life he became associated with the magnates' courts in Lublin and Vilna.

Morsztyn's major works are Światowa Rozkosz (Worldly Pleasure or Worldly Bliss, from 1606), Antypasty małżeńskie (Matrimonial Appetisers from 1650), and Summariusz wierszów (Compendium of poems), a collection of over three hundred poems, written between 1606 and 1613, but never published. Few of his original manuscripts have survived, and most of his works that we know comes from later reprints. Some of the works considered his are attributed to him based on style analysis, as they were reprinted as anonymous. In many of his trifles and songs, Morsztyn praised the beauty of the world, contrasting it with the burden of sin and with eternal bliss, but occasionally he wrote about other issues, including politics - like in his Konfederacji 1614 nagrobek (Tombstone for the 1614 confederation).
