= Kontusz sash =

Cloth sash used for girding a kontusz

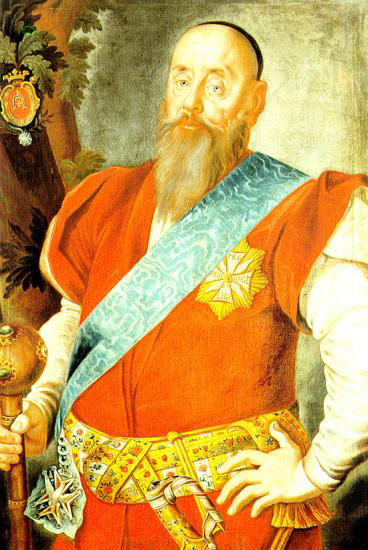
Wacław Rzewuski wearing a golden-finished kontusz sash

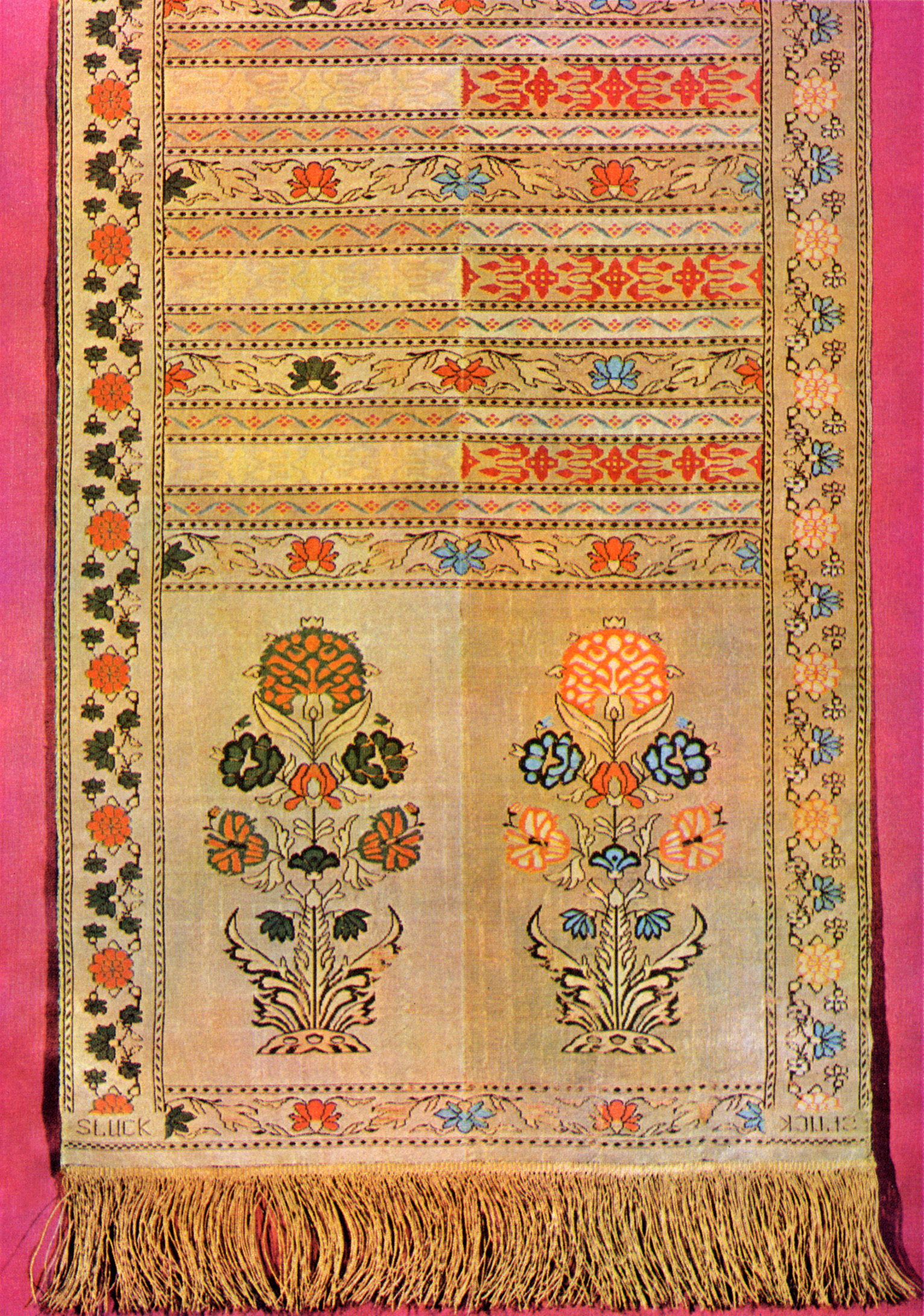
Kontusz scarf

A kontusz sash (Polish: pas kontuszowy, Lithuanian: kontušo juosta, Belarusian: кунтушовы пояс) is a cloth sash used for girding a kontusz (a robe-like garment). It was one of the most distinctive items of male dress of Polish and Lithuanian nobility (szlachta) and is a key component of the national costumes of Poland. In an earlier period, sometimes narrower sashes of fine cloth or silk net were worn, but the wide kontusz sash is specific to the later period.

Kontusz sashes manufactued in Slutsk (now in Belarus) are known as Slutsk sashes.

== History ==
Like the rest of the Polish national dress, the kontusz sash was of eastern origin. It comprised a 3- to 4.5-meter-long strip of fabric covered with varied designs, around 40 cm wide. Luxurious sashes were made with silk and gold. Depending on the sash's width, it might be folded a number of ways so as to reveal various designs on various occasions; the most ornate sashes were considered to have four sides.

Initially such sashes were imported from Persia and Turkey. In the 17th century several sash manufactories were founded at places all over Rzeczpospolita, such as Kobyłka, Lipków, Hrodna, Kraków and Gdańsk. The largest and most notable manufacturies, however, were at Slutsk. Sashes produced there were considered the most desirable and were also the most expensive. Because of the popularity of the pas kontuszowy produced there, it was sometimes called pas słucki (Slutsk sashes), regardless of the actual place of origin. Slutsk sashes had two different color patterns on each side.

The kontusz sash (belt) has an oriental provenance rooted in Persian and Turkish tradition. Continual contact between the Polish–Lithuanian Commonwealth and Persia and even more with Turkey developed vast trade roots and raised popular interest in oriental art and decoration all over Eastern Europe. The kontusz belt was popular in Lithuania and Belarus, in Poland, Ukraine, Hungary, Saxony, Moldavia, Besarabia and some parts of Russia. Kontusz belts were worn by the nobility, Cossack elders and high municipal officials. In the Commonwealth, they were an important visual image of Sarmatism.

The time of prosperity during the period of XVI – XVIII c created surplus financial resources often channeled into culture, art and decoration. Polish Armenian merchants imported objects of luxury: oriental carpets, weapons decorated with gold and stones, expensive fabrics. kontusz belts especially emphasized the status of the bearer and were unusually expensive. At a certain moment the demand for kontusz belts became so large that it was necessary to open local manufacturing on the territory of the Polish–Lithuanian Commonwealth.

The workshops producing kontusz belts in Slutsk, Grodno, Lvov, Vilnius, Buchach, Kobylki, Kraków, Gdansk, Lipkow were opened mostly by Polish–Lithuanian Armenians. The belts that were made there still had a lot of oriental ornamentation, but had their own distinct character – different from the belts formerly imported from Persia and Turkey.

There was a practical aspect to the belt as well. Folded in half and wrapped around the body, it served as a pocket for money and documents. Most belts are about 30 cm wide and around 3,5m long.

As a result of the weaving technique – one side of the belt was a negative of the other. This way it was possible for the belt to have two different color schemes (so called two-sided belt). Further division of the belt allowed for four color compositions (four-sided belt). The price of the belt depended on the materials used (sometimes they added silver and gold thread). The complexity of the design raised the price even more since it required more complicated manufacturing machinery, higher qualifications of the craftsmen and a longer production cycle. The four-sided belts were the most expensive. They were meant to be worn on different occasions: bright side – for weddings, dark side for funerals, green side for the green kontusz etc. Very often the belt served as a table decoration – it was placed on the center atop the table cloth.

== In popular culture ==
A modern Polish poet and a singer, Jacek Kaczmarski, has sung about those sashes in one of his ballads, Z pasa słuckiego pożytek ("The Use of a Slutsk Sash").

== See also ==
- Delia (clothing)
- Kontusz
- Sukmana
- Żupan
