= Piotr Zbylitowski =

Polish poet

Piotr Zbylitowski (1569 – November 19, 1649) was a Polish poet. Courtier of Stanisław Górka and Stanisław Czarnkowski. In his satirical dialogues—Rozmowa szlachcica polskiego z cudzoziemcem (1600), Przygana wymyślnym strojom białogłowskim (1600), Schadzka ziemiańska (1605)—he often criticizes some customs of the Polish nobility, mainly drunkenness, quietism, luxury and disappearance of knight's spirit. He was a first cousin of Andrzej Zbylitowski

== Biography ==
Piotr Zbylitowski was born on November 19, 1569. In 1585 he became a courtier on the court of Stanisław Górka, and in 1592 on the court of Stanisław Czarnkowski. In 1605 he settled in Marcinkowice. Since 1633 district judge deputy (Polish: podsędek) and since 1645 district judge (Polish: sędzia ziemski, Latin: iudex terrestris) of Kraków.

He died in 1649.

== Notable works ==
Dialogues

- Rozmowa szlachcica polskiego z cudzoziemcem (1600)
- Przygana wymyślnym strojom białogłowskim (1600)
- Schadzka ziemiańska (1605)
