= Andrzej Zbylitowski =

Polish poet (c. 1565 - c. 1608)

- Born: c. 1565; Zagorzyce, Świętokrzyskie Voivodeship
- Died: c. 1608
- Occupation: Poet

Andrzej Zbylitowski (c. 1565 – c. 1608) was a Polish poet, author of occasional poems, panegyrics and narrative poetry works. He was a continuator of Jan Kochanowski traditions of territorial poetry.

== Biography ==
Andrzej Zbylitowski was born around 1565, probably in Zagorzyce, Świętokrzyskie Voivodeship, as a son of Stanisław and Jadwiga Rożnówna, and also a first cousin of Piotr Zbylitowski. After he finished studies abroad, he back to the country, and in 1585 became a courtier on the royal court of Stefan Batory, and later of Zygmunt III Waza. In 1592 he became a Master of the Pantry of the Crown (Polish: stolnik nadworny). In his political views, he was a follower of Jan Zamoyski. As a political poet known for his surname, he became popular during the sejm in the years of 1590–1591. Zbylitowski was a very productive court poet, his most notable political works includes 1587 welcoming writing for Zygmunt III Waza who was back to Rzeczpospolita, congratulatory poem for Battle of Byczyna O zwycięstwie osiągniętym w r. 1588, today unknown poem for Anna of Finland Pisanie satyrów puszcz litewskich... o łowach w Białobieżach (1589), Epithalamium na wesele... Zygmuntowi III i arcyksiężnie JM rakuskiej Annie (1592) and 1595 genethliacon for the occasion of prince Władysław's baptism. In 1593 Zbylitowski travelled to Sweden with companion of Zygmunt III Waza, and depicted that travel in poem Droga do Szwecyjej namożniejszego w północnych krainach Pana, Zygmunta III, polskiego i szwedzkiego króla, odprawiona w roku 1594, published later in 1597 by Jakub Siebeneicher. In ca. 1597 he settled in Zbylitowska Góra where he wrote two rural poems: Żywot szlachcica we wsi (1597) and Wieśniak (1600).

He died around 1608.
