= Sukmana =

Traditional coat worn by peasants in Poland

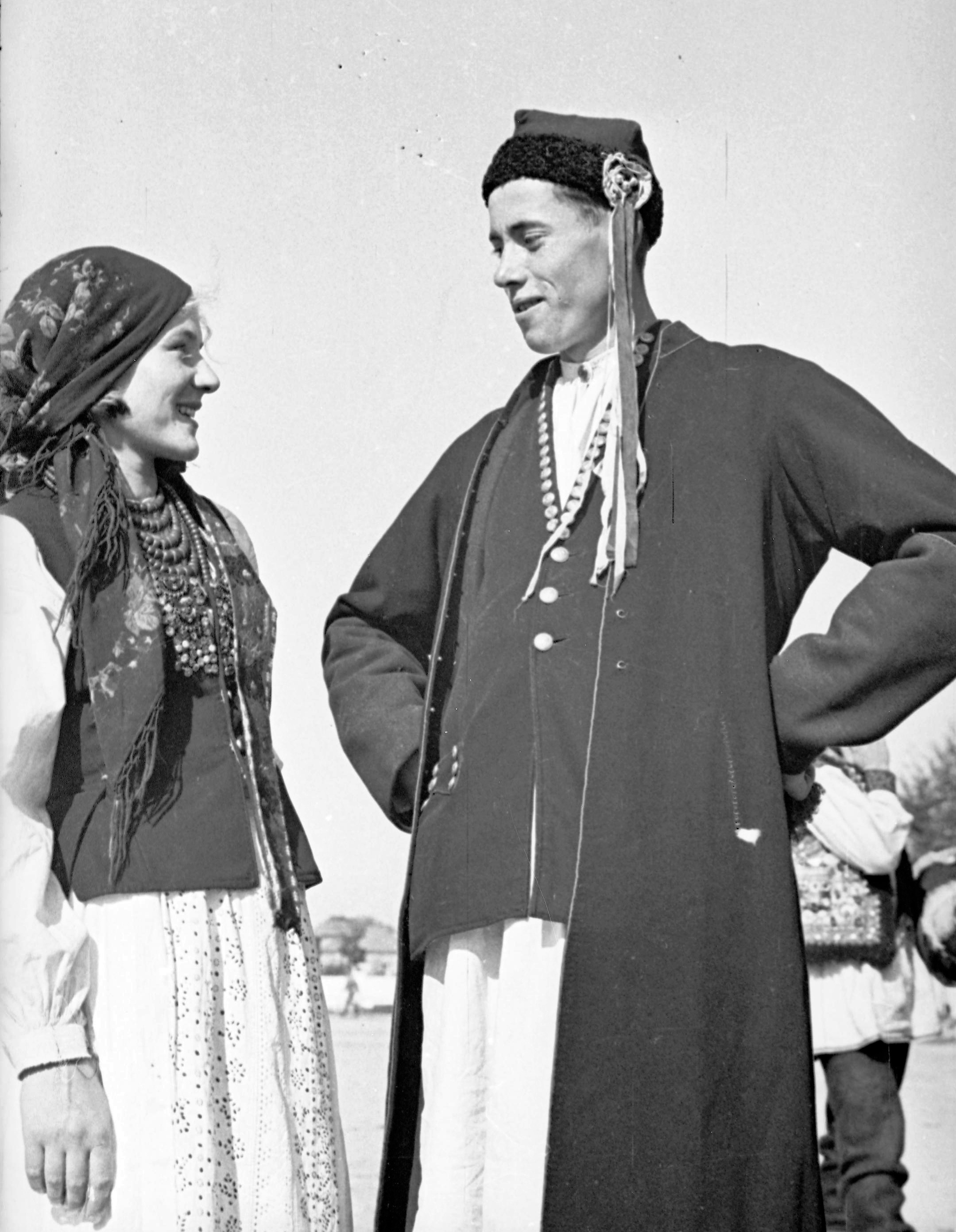
- A person (right) wearing a sukmana, 1936. Image from the National Digital Archives
- Type: Coat
- Material: Russet
- Place of origin: Central and Eastern Europe

Sukmana is a type of traditional coat once worn by peasants in Poland, and some other Central European countries, as well as Hungary (where it was known as szokmány). It was particularly common from the 18th to early 20th centuries. It was made from a simple, hand woven wool fabric comparable to russet cloth, and usually retained its natural white or grayish color. The coat was long, with sleeves, and wider towards the lower parts.

It was worn by men and sometimes by women.

== See also ==
- Kontusz
- Żupan
- Delia
