= Kontusz =

Garment worn by Polish-Lithuanian and Hungarian noblemen

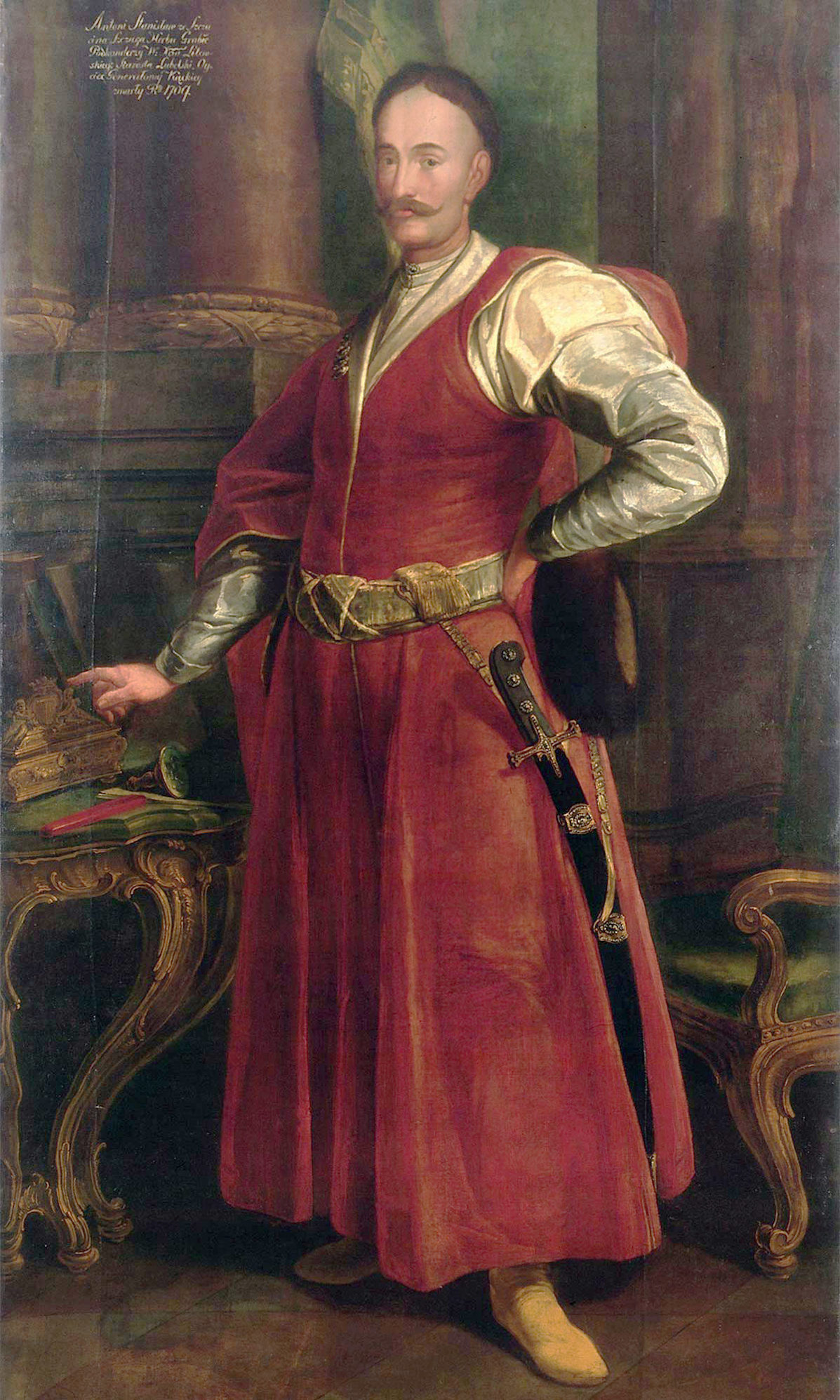
Polish noble Stanisław Antoni Szczuka (1652–1710) in a representative national Polish outfit. A red kontusz tied with a pas kontuszowy. Underneath a żupan with a low collar. Left hand holds a fur cap with a low band. Characteristic hair and moustache. Unknown artist.

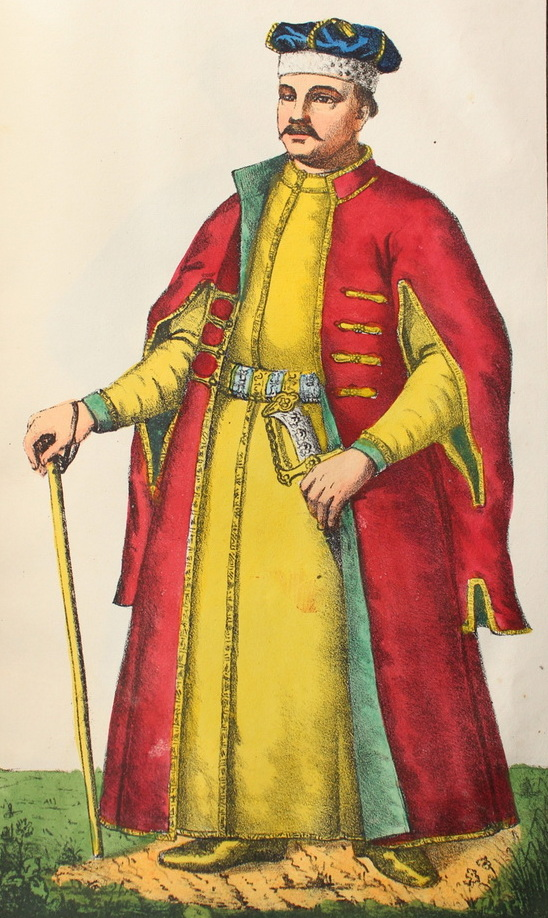
Noble Ukrainian Cossack in a yellow żupan and red kontusz.

Kontusz (Note: Polish: kontusz, pl. kontusze; Belarusian: кунтуш; Ukrainian: кунтуш, romanized: kuntush; Lithuanian: kontušas; originally from Hungarian: köntös, lit. 'robe'.) (Polish pronunciation: [ˈkɔn.tuʂ]) is a type of outer garment worn by Polish, Lithuanian, and Hungarian nobility, and a symbol of Sarmatian identity. It became popular in the 16th century after being introduced into the Polish–Lithuanian Commonwealth from Turkey through Hungary. In the 17th century, worn over an inner garment (żupan), the kontusz became a notable element of the Polish national costume and Zaporozhian Cossack attire.

The kontusz was a long robe, usually reaching to below the knees, with a set of decorative buttons down the front. The sleeves were long and loose, on hot days worn untied, thrown on the back. In winter a fur lining could be attached to the kontusz, or a delia worn over it. The kontusz was usually of a vivid colour, and the lining was of a contrasting hue. The kontusz was tied with a long, wide sash called a pas kontuszowy.

In 1776, Sejm deputies from different voivodeships of Poland were obliged to wear different coloured żupany and kontusze denoting their voivodeships.

In Poland, the kontusz was worn mainly by the nobility, but it was also adopted by the Zaporozhian cossacks when Ukraine and Ruthenia were under Polish rule.

== See also ==
- Delia (clothing)
- Kontusz sash
- Sukmana
- Żupan
