= Delia (clothing) =

Buttoned coat with wide sleeves, worn by Polish-Lithuanian noblemen

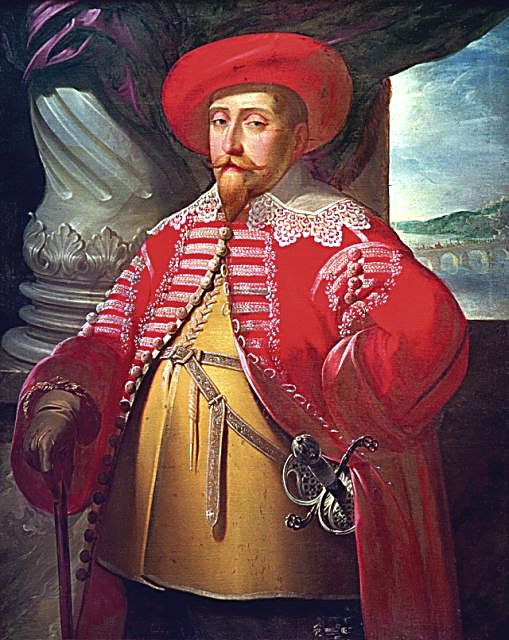
Gustavus Adolphus of Sweden in Polish delia coat, painting by Merian 1632

Delia (Polish pronunciation: [ˈdɛlja]) is a garment worn by male szlachta (nobility) of the Polish–Lithuanian Commonwealth. The delia is similar to a coat or cloak and was worn over the żupan from the 16th until the early 18th century.

The delia was usually fashioned from wool, cotton, or velvet and finished with fur. The typical delia had short, loose, unsewn sleeves and was fastened with metal buttons over the breast. The delia was of Oriental origin, and the word itself came to Poland in the mid-16th century from Turkey.

== See also ==
- Kontusz
- Kontusz sash
- Żupan
