= Żupan =

Gown in Polish national costume

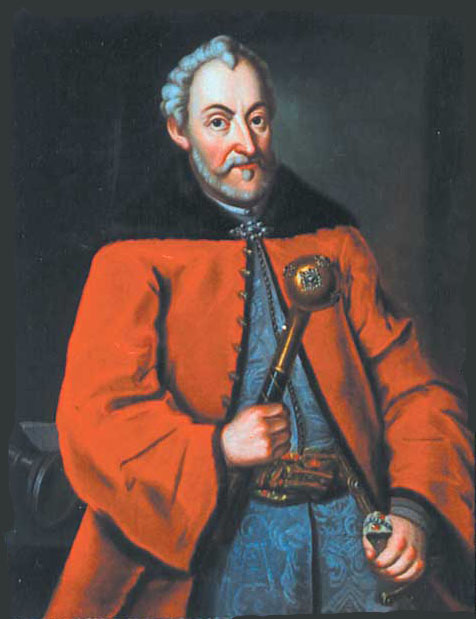
Polish magnate Jan Zamoyski (1542-1605) dressed in a crimson delia over a blue silk żupan, and tied with a pas kontuszowy. The right hand holds a buława.

Żupan (Polish pronunciation: [ˈʐupan]; Lithuanian: žiponas, Czech: župan, Slovak: župan, Belarusian: жупан, Ukrainian: жупан) is a long-lined garment of West or Central Asian origin which was widely worn by male nobles in the multi-ethnic Polish–Lithuanian Commonwealth and by the Ukrainian Cossacks in the Cossack Hetmanate. It was a typical upper class male attire from the late 16th to the first half of the 18th century.

== Derivation ==
The name żupan has other spelling variations—czupan (from czupkan, a Crimean Tatar word or alternatively from zuban or ziban—a Turkic word according to Julian Horoszkiewicz), etymologically related to the Central Asian chapan and also the Japanese juban. Alternatively, the name originates from the Italian word giuppa (gown) which in turn might have come from Arabic (jubba), although the garment itself probably is of Central Asian nomadic origin. or from Middle English / Middle French jupon (an overcoat for armour). Whether the garment came from Central Asia or Ottoman Turkey or Iran still remains a question, and the same applies to the allied male garment—the kontusz. The Central Asian origin of this garment may be also deduced from the method of closure of the pre-1680s zupany, for they were closed from right to left—typical to Central Asian fashion, while the sleeve-ends terminated with dog-ears that were almost like gloves without covering the fingers, and were usually upturned to show the differently colored lining. Eventually an agraffe (clasp) or button was attached to this dog-ear sleeve-end to pin it to a sleeve once upturned and thus a cuff was created. This style of cuff was known in the Louis XIV period in France as the Polish cuff and might have led to the development of colorful military cuffs used in West European armies from 18th century onwards.

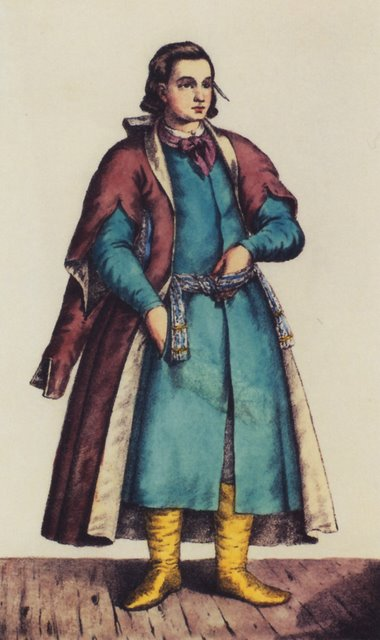
A Ukrainian cossack clerk wearing a blue żupan under a kontusz (1786)

After the partition of Ukraine in 1663 (The Ruin), the inhabitants of Left Bank Ukraine continued to wear the żupan, the name transliterated into Ukrainian: жупан, and also adopted the kontusz from their Right Bank counterparts as part of their dress, and therefore żupan was worn by Ukrainian nobility, wealthy merchants, cossacks, wealthier peasants and town dwellers.

== Development ==
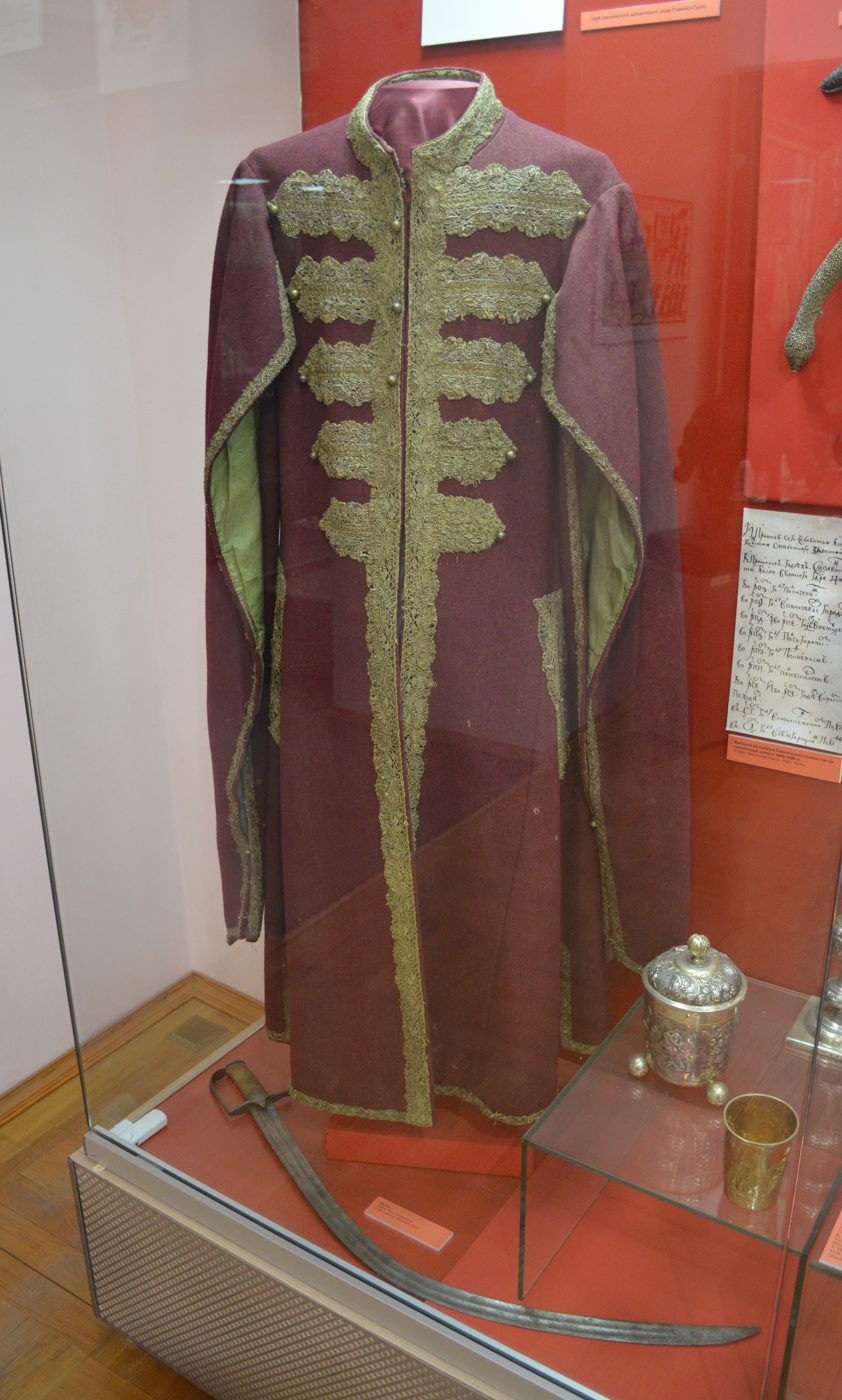
Żupan, Polish–Lithuanian Commonwealth, 18th century.

During the 16th century the żupan was a popular male costume worn in the territory of the Polish Kingdom and Grand Duchy of Lithuania, these being after 1569 the Polish–Lithuanian Commonwealth. Males of all social classes wore it, although only those of the nobility (szlachta) were made of the most expensive and colorful textiles, whilst sumptuary laws and expense restricted the colors and richness of the constituent textiles of żupan of men of lesser social class. The earliest known mention of żupan was in 1393, and the costume gradually was adopted during the 16th century as the customary national garment for men, first by nobility and later by the lesser social classes.

The żupan was a long, robe-like, long-sleeved garment that opened and closed in the front with a row of buttons. Later these buttons were frequently decorative buttons denominated "guzy". Since the 1570s the garment also had a collar. This basic design did not change except for the size and cut of the collar, and the kind of composing fabric. Until the 1660s the collars were tall, and then gradually they were shortened and their corners rounded and framed an opening. At first the żupan served as an outer garment and was made from sturdy cloth or wool, was often lined with fur, and was worn with a belt from which nobility hung a sword. Nobles and the affluent, such as merchants, wore it underneath customary outer garments like the bekiesza, delia, ferezja, szuba, and burka. Gradually the garment was made lighter for wear underneath the kontusz, while the belt became a colorful affair that was worn over the kontusz. In case of poorer nobles and men of lesser social class it remained an outer garment until its abandonment, while affluent burghers wore it as an inner garment along with the kontusz and other outer garments, in the fashion of nobility.

In Polish military use both cavalry and infantry wore a żupan as the sole outer garment. Polish heavy cavalry (hussars) and medial cavalry (pancerni) wore it immediately beneath armor. A padded iteration derived from Central Asian custom was perhaps denominated an "arming coat"; an example of this is in the Polish Army Museum. The common, shorter, iteration for cavalry was denominated the "żupanik".

After the 1680s the żupan was customarily worn beneath a kontusz, and in such combination the two garments became the customary attire for Ukrainian cossacks and the Polish national costume for men until the mid-19th century.

== Construction and color ==
A żupan was made of many fabrics as were available to the szlachta or the lower classes. Magnates generally wore żupany sporting golden or jewelled buttons, and tailored from the most expensive fabrics of their times such as the very expensive Persian fabric known as crimson, which won their wearers the name, karmazyni or "crimson men", then from various expensive silk-based fabrics like satins, brocades and damascs. Richer szlachta emulated the magnates with cheaper versions of silk-and-linen fabrics while the lower levels of szlachta usually wore żupany made out of cheaper white linen (summer) or duller in colour varieties of wool (winter), hence their nickname, szaraczkowie — "grey men". Colors of żupan varied, however the lining was always of a different color than the outer fabric.

Other social classes tried to emulate the szlachta. Poorer townsfolk often wore żupany made from hemp, which resulted in them being nicknamed łyczki. Polish Jews wore black żupany, and peasants wore simple, white (summer) and greyish (winter) żupany from wool or simple cloth.

In 18th-century Poland, the żupan became even lighter, with long and narrow sleeves, while the unseen back was tailored from some inexpensive fabrics such as linen or cotton. It then assumed its final version (when worn with the kontusz and wide, colourful fabric belt) and survived into the 19th century as a part of the Polish "national dress" — integral to regional male costumes, including those of peasants.

== Gallery ==
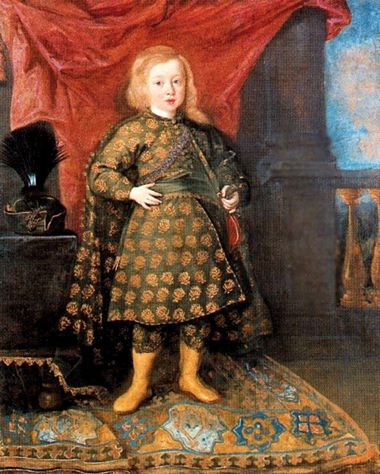
Prince Sigismund Casimir Vasa in a green żupan, c. 1644

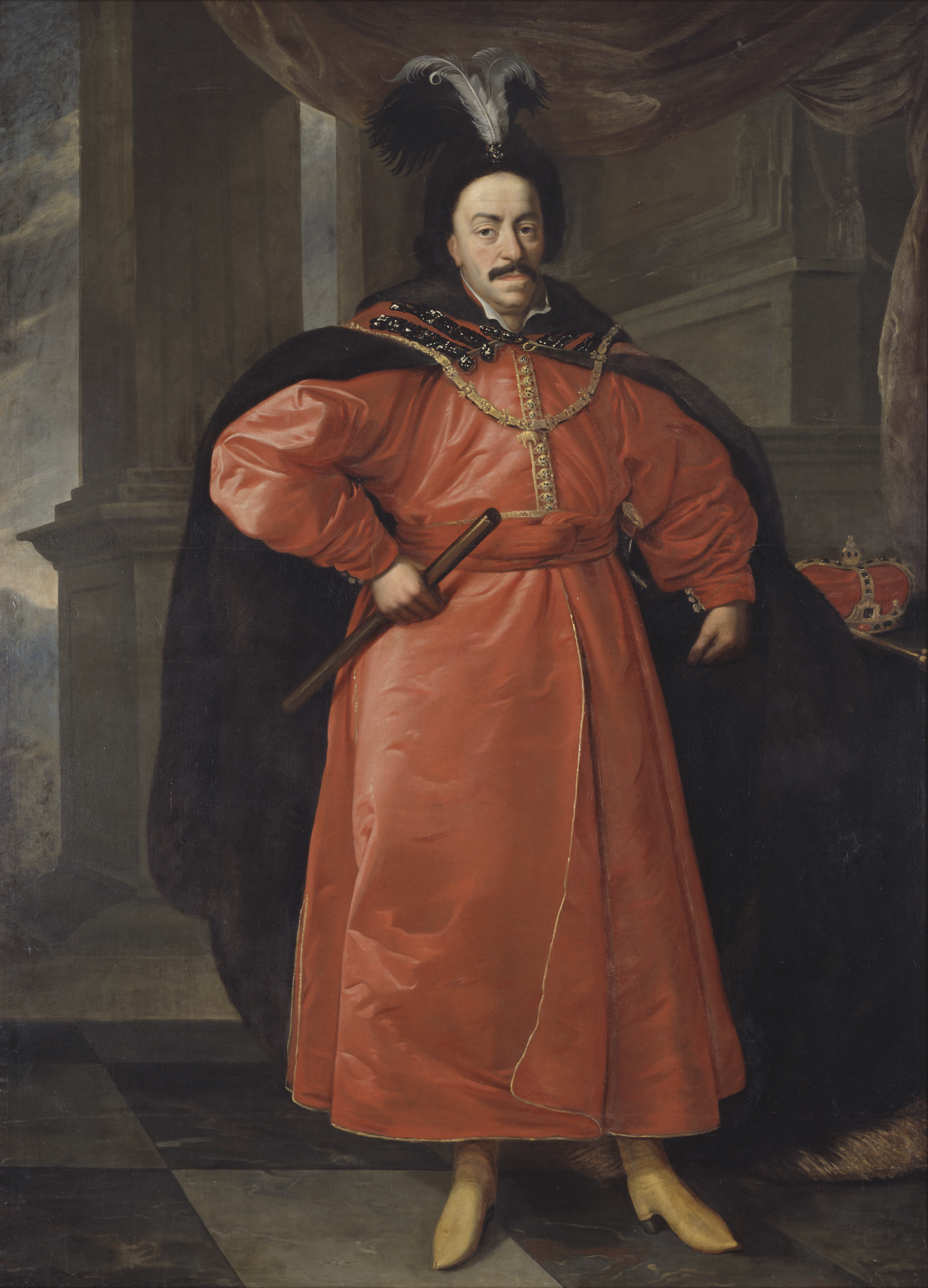
King John II Casimir in a crimson żupan and delia, c. 1649

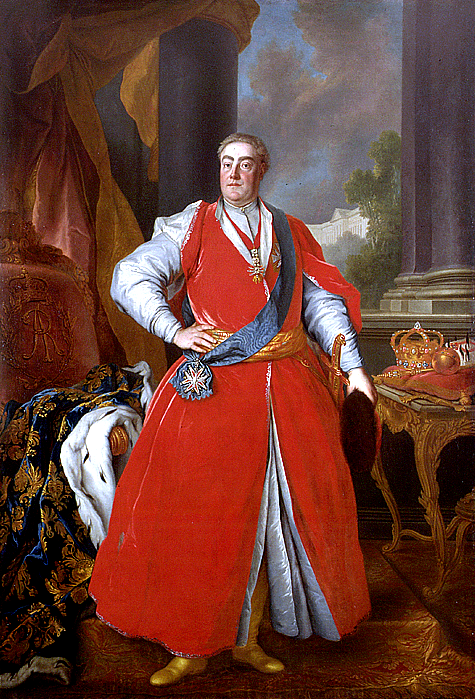
King Augustus III of Poland in a white żupan, c. 1756

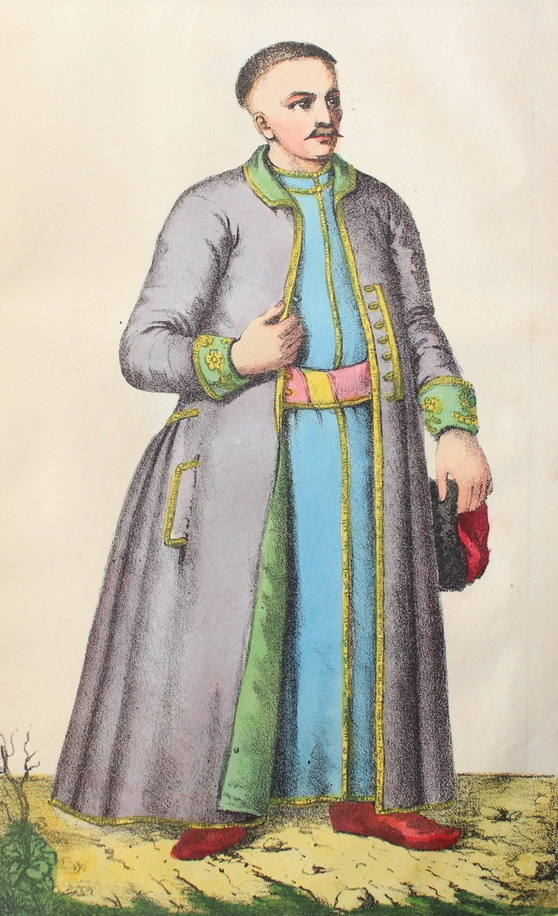
Ukrainian lower middle class citizen in a blue żupan.

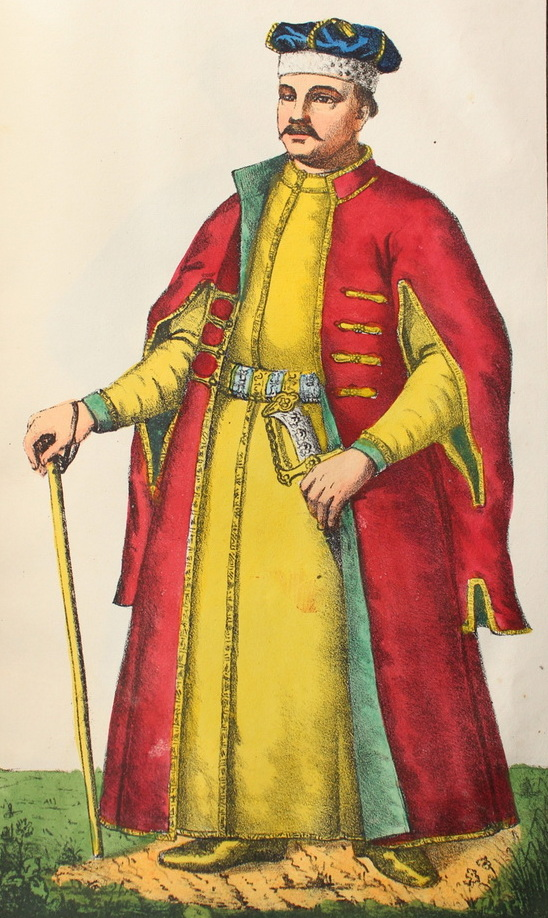
Ukrainian Cossack nobleman in a yellow żupan.

== See also ==
- Delia (clothing)
- Kontusz
- Kontusz sash
- Sukmana
- Sherwani
