= 1632 Polish–Lithuanian royal election =

Royal election in the Polish–Lithuanian Commonwealth

1632 Polish–Lithuanian Free election
- September 27, 1632 – November 8, 1632
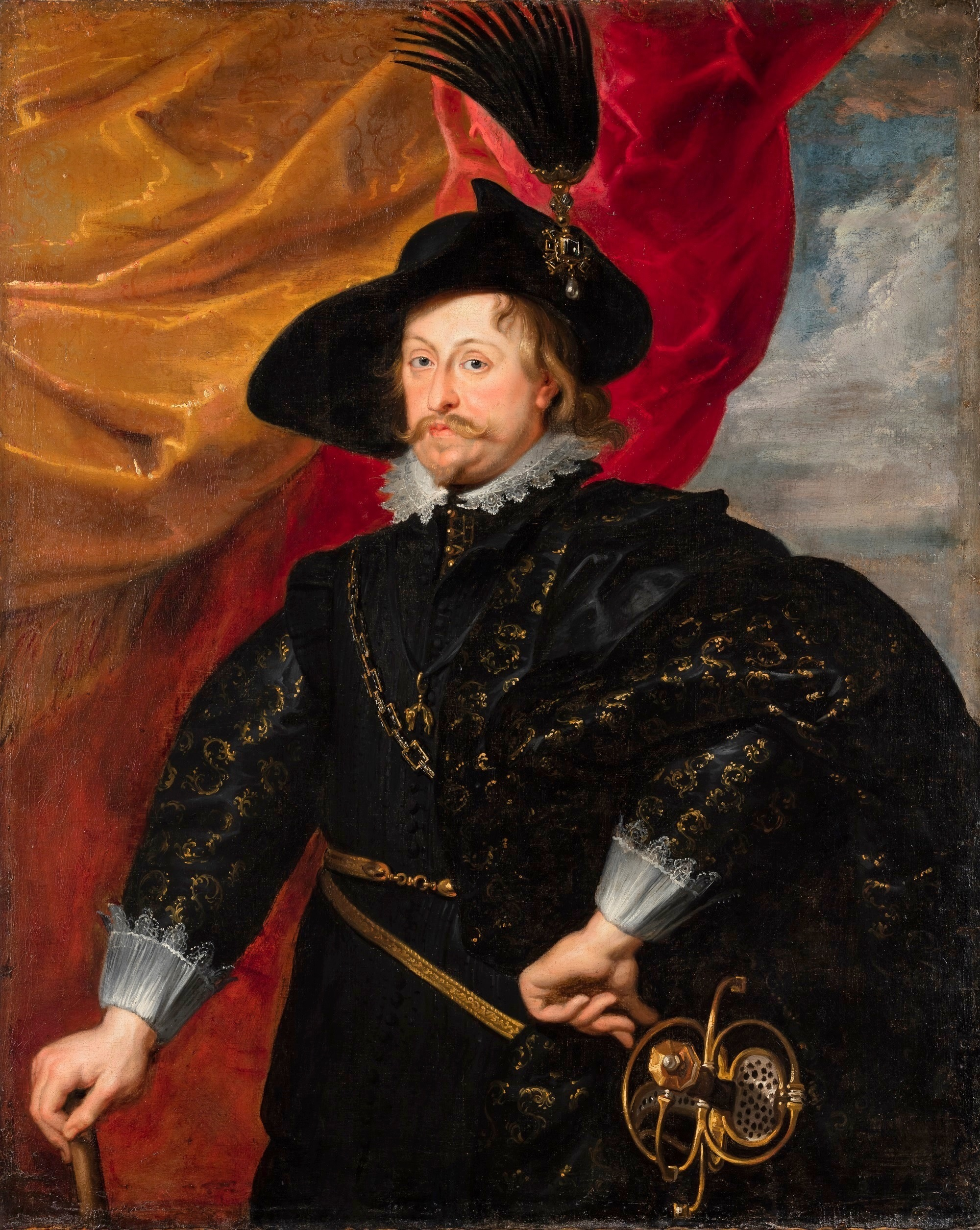
Candidate	Władysław Vasa
Delegate count	>3,543
King before election
Sigismund III Vasa
Elected King
Władysław IV Vasa

The 1632 free election in the Polish–Lithuanian Commonwealth commenced between September 27 and November 8, 1632. It then extended to November 13, 1632. The election sejm elevated Władysław IV to the Polish throne. Władysław had won the support of most of the political factions; and in the absence of any other serious contenders, he was elected King of Poland and Grand Duke of Lithuania.

== Background ==
While Władysław and his father Sigismund III Vasa tried to ensure Władysław's election during Sigismund's lifetime, the option of premature succession was not popular with the nobility; the Vasas' repeated attempts failed, up to and including at the Sejm of 1631. The question of succession was resolved soon enough however, upon Sigismund's sudden heart attack on 23 April 1632 and death in the morning hours of 30 April.

Every Polish–Lithuanian election sejm was preceded by a convocation sejm. In accordance with the dictates of the law, the Primate of Poland, Jan Wężyk, acting as Interrex, summoned a convocation sejm for June 22, 1632, which lasted through August 17. Krzysztof Radziwiłł was selected as Marshal of the Sejm. Non-Catholics, led by Marshal Radziwiłł and the magnate Bogusław Leszczyński, demanded increased rights; they were opposed by Voivode Tomasz Zamoyski and the future Bishop Aleksander Trzebiński, but managed to gather enough support that this question dominated the ensuing election sejm.

== Candidates ==
There was little doubt Władysław would succeed his father Sigismund. Some of the Commonwealth's magnates and Catholic clergy did favor Władysław's brother, Jan Kazimierz, in the royal election. However, he had less support than Władysław and his candidacy was never officially put forward, since he was additionally disadvantaged as a younger son in the royal chain of succession and by Sigismund's deathbed blessing of Władysław as his successor.

Foreign courts did not avail themselves of the opportunity to promote their own candidates for the Polish throne. Austria's Habsburgs were well disposed toward the Polish Vasas and did not put forward a contender. Fears that King Gustavus II Adolphus, of the Swedish Vasas, would put forward his own candidacy proved unfounded, though his envoy Steno Belke did argue that Władysław should renounce his claim to the Swedish throne (Władysław declined.) Foreign envoys such as Papal Nuncio Honorat Visconti and the Holy Roman Emperor's envoy Count Julius Mosberg declared their support for Władysław. The Duke of Prussia, George William, Elector of Brandenburg, asked to be permitted to participate in the election sejm but this request was turned down. Muscovy was just then preparing for war with the Commonwealth and failed to put forward a candidate—indeed, it attacked while the election sejm was subsequently in session.

Consequently, Władysław's was the first uncontested election in nearly sixty years.

== Election ==
The Election Sejm of 1632 convened on 27 September at its traditional site at Wola near Warsaw to consider both the royal election and legislative items, with Marshal of the Sejm Jakub Sobieski presiding.

The indecisiveness of the Catholic faction allowed Władysław to campaign for increased rights for Protestants and Eastern Orthodox Christians, and thus he obtained their support. At the same time, his evident religious tolerance did not lose him the support of his Catholic backers. Nor did Władysław's breaking custom to go to Warsaw during the election generate noticeable disapproval.

A commission headed by Władysław drafted "Measures for the Appeasement of the Ruthenian People of the Greek Faith that Live in the Kingdom of Poland and the Grand Duchy of Lithuania," by which Ukrainian Greek Catholic and Orthodox metropolitans were granted legal jurisdiction. Władysław, lobbied by Peter Mogila, also granted the Orthodox Church the right to its own hierarchs, subject to the candidates' confirmation by the government. Many differences regarding the Orthodox Church and the Union of Brest were thus settled. The religious freedoms that had been established in 1573 by the Warsaw Confederation were reaffirmed, and a new tax was adopted, the kwarta, which sent 1/4 of starostwos' incomes to the Royal Treasury. It was decided to fortify Puck and to create there a port for the Commonwealth Navy. The Cossack delegation's proposal for increased funding and a Cossack register was turned down; similarly, requests from the Royal Army were rejected. Some of the Sejm's proposals were vetoed by the Senate.

The decision on who would be the Commonwealth's next king was reached on November 8, but as the pacta conventa were not yet ready, the official announcement was delayed until November 13. In the pacta conventa, Władysław pledged himself to fund a military school and equipment; to find a way to fund a naval fleet; to maintain current alliances; not to raise armies, give offices or military ranks to foreigners, negotiate peace treaties or declare war without the Sejm's approval; not to take a wife without the Senate's approval; to convince his brothers to take an oath to the Commonwealth; and to transfer the profits from the Royal Mint to the Royal Treasury rather than to a private treasury.

At least 3,543 votes were cast for Władysław. When the election result were announced by the Crown Grand Marshal, Łukasz Opaliński, the nobility (szlachta) who had taken part in the election began festivities in honor of the new king, which lasted three hours.

This election sejm was the third sejm of 1632. It had been preceded by an ordinary general sejm (March 11 – April 2, 1632) and by the convocation sejm (June - August 1632) .

== Aftermath ==
The next day, November 14, 1632, Władysław signed his pacta conventa and the Henrician Articles that had been required of new Polish kings since the 1573 election of France's Henri de Valois to the Polish throne.

Władysław was crowned king on February 5, 1633, the proceedings continuing into the next day.

The coronation sejm, presided over by Marshal of the Sejm Mikołaj Ostroróg, took place from February 8 to March 17, 1633. It confirmed the Orthodox rights that had been pledged by Władysław, but did not support Władysław's proposal to create a Kawaleria, an honorary brotherhood for his supporters. This would be one of many setbacks that Władysław would suffer at the hands of the Sejm.

The 1633 Sejm would also take more direct control of the royal mint, deepen the sway of serfdom, and accept the petition of Polish Jews to forbid the printing of antisemitic literature, its importation from Western Europe, and its distribution in the Commonwealth. The Sejm also declared war on Muscovy, which had invaded the Commonwealth the previous fall.

== See also ==
- History of Poland in the Early Modern era (1569–1795)
- Royal elections in Poland
- Golden Liberty
- Henrician Articles
