= 1576 Polish–Lithuanian royal election =

Anna Jagiellon, Stephen Báthory elected

1576 Polish–Lithuanian Free election
- November 8, 1575 – February 1, 1576
- Turnout: ~12,000 ▼
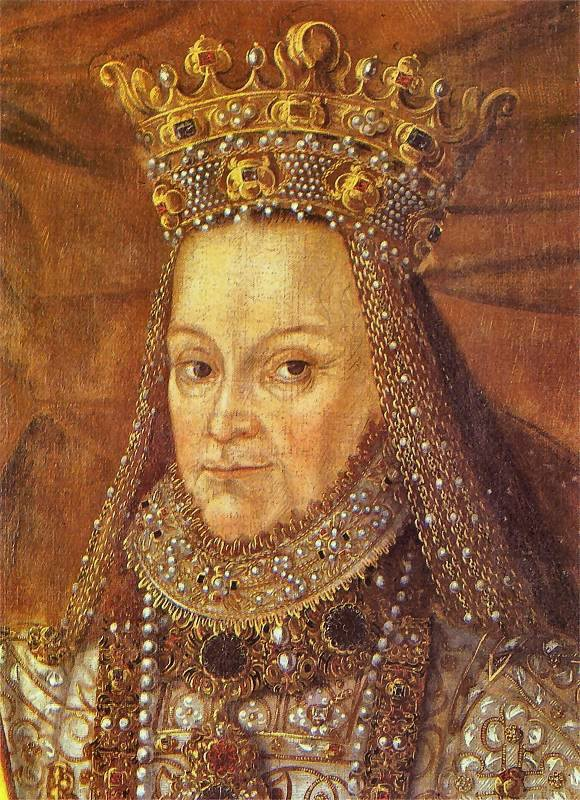

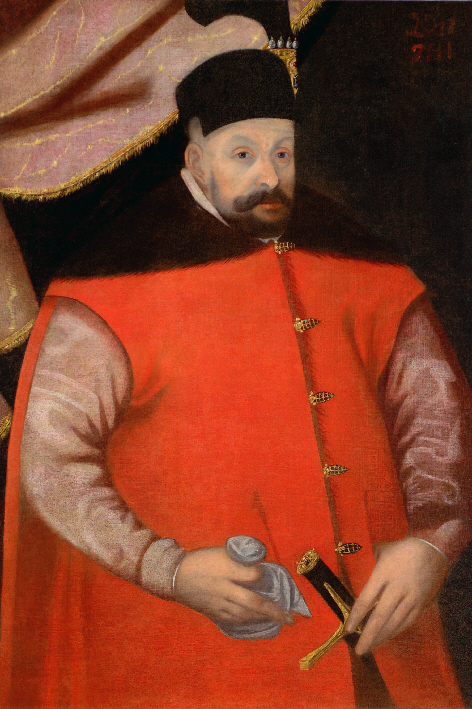

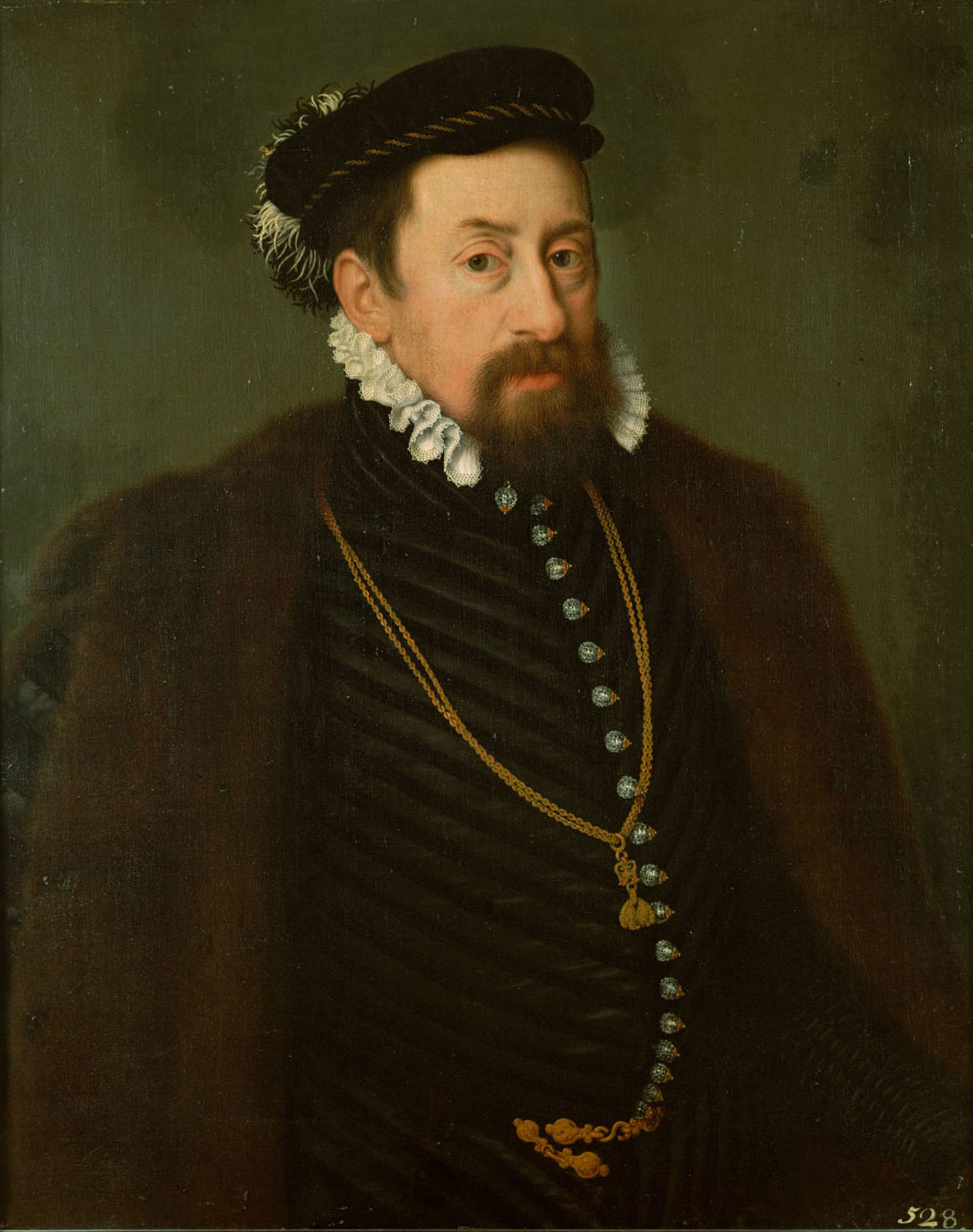
Candidate	Anna Jagiellon; Stephen Báthory	Emperor Maximilian II
Faction	"Piast"	Pro-Habsburg
Result	Elected	Defeated
King before election
Henry III of France
Elected Kings
Anna Jagiellon
Stephen Báthory

The free election of 1576 was the second royal election to be held in the Polish–Lithuanian Commonwealth, which took place in 1575/1576. In the night of June 28–29, 1574, King Henry III of France secretly left Poland to claim the French throne. The Commonwealth was left without a monarch, and the period of interregnum ended with a double election. After a few months of negotiations, Anna Jagiellon and Stephen Báthory were elected co-rulers.

== Background ==
Henry was elected king of the Polish–Lithuanian Commonwealth in 1573. After finding out about the death of his brother, King Charles IX of France, who died on 30 May 1574, Henry decided to secretly leave Poland, and return to his homeland. This plan was supported by his mother, Catherine de' Medici, who resumed the regency until Henry's return from Poland. Polish nobility had previously considered this option: Henry was to marry Anna Jagiellon, and return to France, leaving his wife in the Commonwealth. Thus, the two nations would be ruled by a royal couple.

Since the Polish–Lithuanian Commonwealth was left without a monarch, and there was uncertainty and fear of civil strife, in late August 1574 the Primate of Poland called a council of senators and magnate. The council, which did not include envoys from the Grand Duchy of Lithuania, the Duchy of Livonia and Royal Prussia, discussed whether Henry should still be regarded King of Poland. After lengthy deliberations, Henry was called to return to Kraków before May 12, 1575. But Henry was crowned king Henry III of France in Rheims in February 1575.

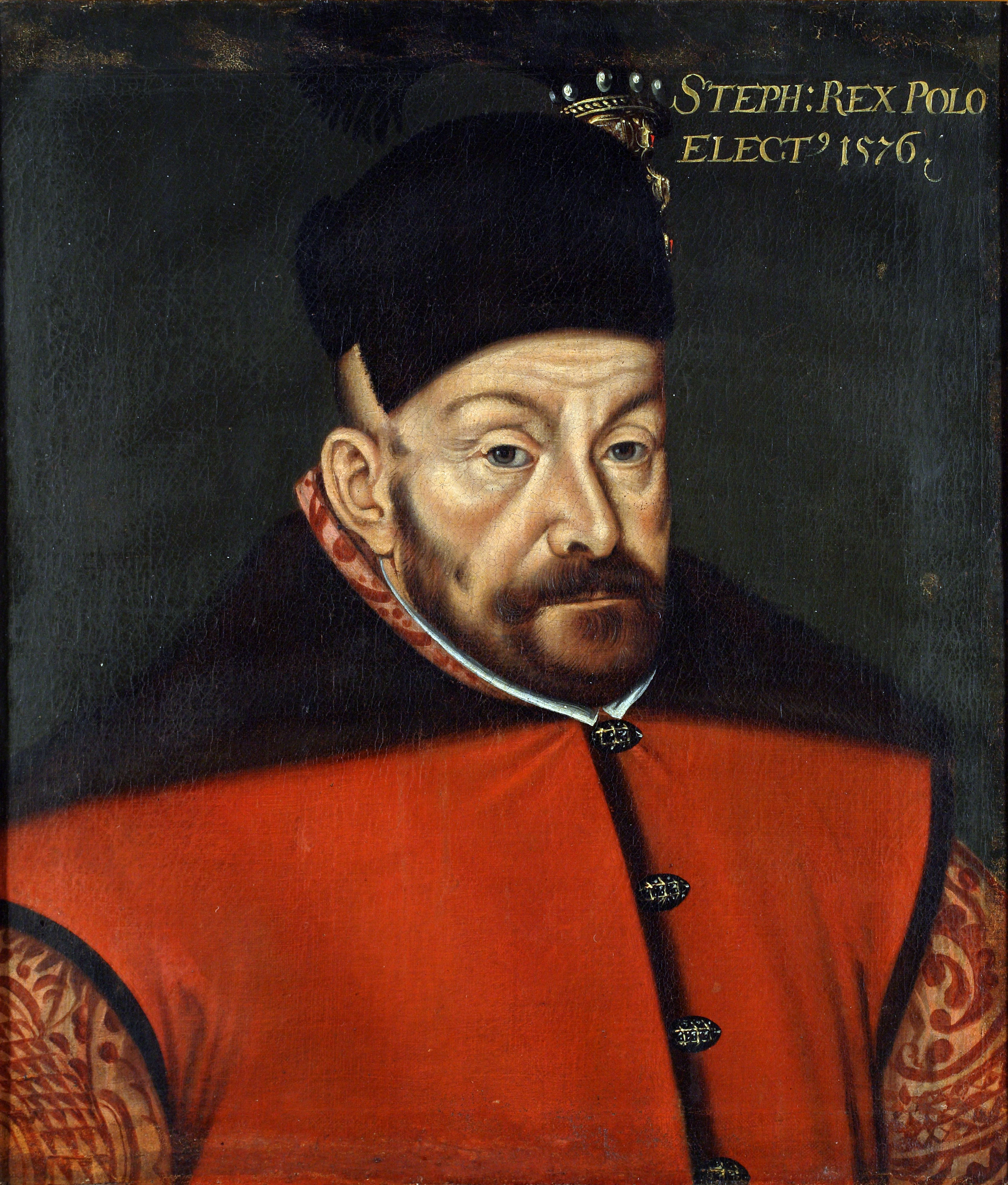
Stephen Báthory

In May 1575, Polish nobility gathered at Stężyca, but no decision was taken. Internal conflict between pro- and anti–Habsburg factions deepened, while southeastern provinces of Red Ruthenia and Podolia were raided by Crimean Tatars, who captured thousands of people. Finally, with support of Senate, the Primate officially declared interregnum.

Before the 1576 Polish–Lithuanian royal election a congress of the Grand Duchy of Lithuania's nobles was held on 20 April 1576 in Grodno which adopted a Universal, signed by the participating high-ranking Lithuanian officials and nobles, which announced that if the delegates of the Grand Duchy of Lithuania will feel pressure from the Poles in the Election sejm, the Lithuanians will not be obliged by an oath of the Union of Lublin and will have the right to select a separate monarch.

== Convocation Sejm ==
Primate Jakub Uchanski summoned the Convocation Sejm to Warsaw on October 3, 1575. The date of royal election was set for November 7. Pro-French and pro-Habsburg faction, which consisted of most senators, Roman Catholic clergy (including Uchanski himself), Protestants, Prussian cities and Lithuanians supported Maximilian II, Holy Roman Emperor. Also, envoys of the Spanish Empire supported Habsburg faction (although preferred the younger and ultra-Catholic Archduke Ernest of Austria, former Habsburg candidate in 1573, over the older and "crypto-Protestant" current Habsburg candidate, Emperor Maximilian) by sending gifts, money and American gold to the electors, wanting to restore the good Poland-Spain relations after the controversy of the Neapolitan sums. They also feared the maintenance of the Franco-Polish Alliance that, complemented with Franco-Ottoman alliance, could menace Habsburg future victories on Imperial election (and so, isolating Habsburg Spain in Central Europe and Mediterranean Sea) and maybe provoke a European War due to the Valois menace over Balance of power.

Most of Polish szlachta, however, backed an unspecified Piast candidate. As a future king, they saw Jan Zamoyski, John III of Sweden or Prince of Transylvania, Stephen Báthory. Also, envoys of the Ottoman Empire supported either John III or Bathory. Turkish opinion mattered, as the nobility wanted to avoid any military conflicts with such a powerful neighbor.

== Election ==
The Election Sejm began on November 8, 1575, with speeches of envoys of royal candidates. Among Senators, supporters of Maximilian II were in the majority, while among Sejm deputies, there were either supporters of a native, Piast candidate (Jan Zamoyski, Mikołaj Sienicki) or Stephen Báthory (Andrzej Zborowski).

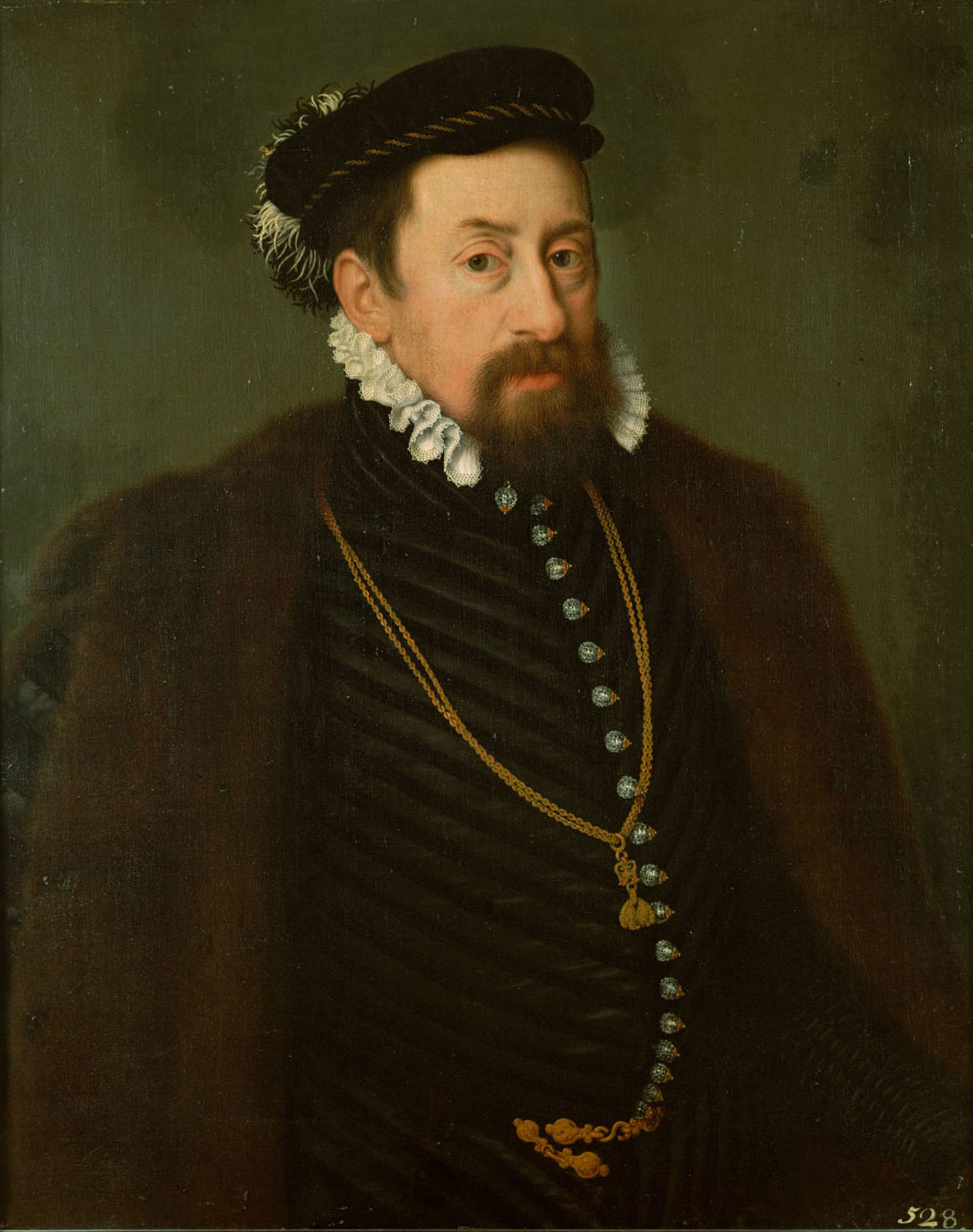
Maximilian II Habsburg

After several heated arguments, on December 12, 1575, Primate Uchanski, under pressure from Papal nuncio Vincenzo Lauro, declared Maximilian II new King of Poland and Grand Duke of Lithuania. This was opposed by the nobility, as Uchanski made the declaration without its support. Among Polish szlachta, Stephen Báthory became popular, and, urged by Zamoyski and Teczynski, the nobility decided that Anna Jagiellon should marry Bathory.

On January 18, 1576, supporters of Bathory gathered near Jędrzejów, and in February, they moved to Kraków. Most were members of Ruthenian nobility, there also were influential senators, such as Andrzej Zborowski and Stanisław Karnkowski, also Bishop of Kujawy, Stanislaw Karnkowski. Meanwhile, envoys of Maximilian came to Jędrzejów, urging the nobility to support his son, Archduke Ernest of Austria. Also, Bathory sent his envoy to Jędrzejów, a Protestant nobleman Hieronim Filipowski.

On February 1, the nobility confirmed election of Bathory, and scheduled the coronation for March 4. On February 8, in a Cathedral at Mediaș, Bathory confirmed the pacta conventa, and swore to recover the lands which had been occupied by Ivan the Terrible. Soon afterwards, he began preparing for the journey to Poland. On March 4, Polish envoys sent to Transilvania returned to Kraków, presenting the pacta conventa document signed by Bathory. On April 6, the Transilvanian Duke crossed Polish border, and on April 18, he entered Kraków.

On May 1, 1576, Bishop Karnkowski married Anne Jagiellon to Bathory, and crowned the couple. Since the election was not confirmed by Lithuania, Royal Prussia and Primate Uchanski, Bathory immediately began negotiations, hoping to avoid a civil war. His efforts were fruitful.

== See also ==
- History of Poland in the Early Modern era (1569–1795)
- Royal elections in Poland
- Golden Liberty
- Henrician Articles

== Sources ==
- S. Grzybowski, Dzieje Polski i Litwy (1506–1648), pod red. S. Grodziskiego, w: Wielka Historia Polski, Kraków 2003
- U. Augustyniak, Historia Polski 1572–1795, Warszawa 2008
- S. Cynarski, Zygmunt August, Wrocław 2004
- Z. Wójcik, Wiek XVI-XVII, Warszawa 1991
- M. Markiewicz, Historia Polski 1494–1795, Kraków 2002
