= 1669 Polish–Lithuanian royal election =

Royal election in the Polish–Lithuanian Commonwealth

1669 Polish–Lithuanian Free election
- May 1, 1669 – June 19, 1669
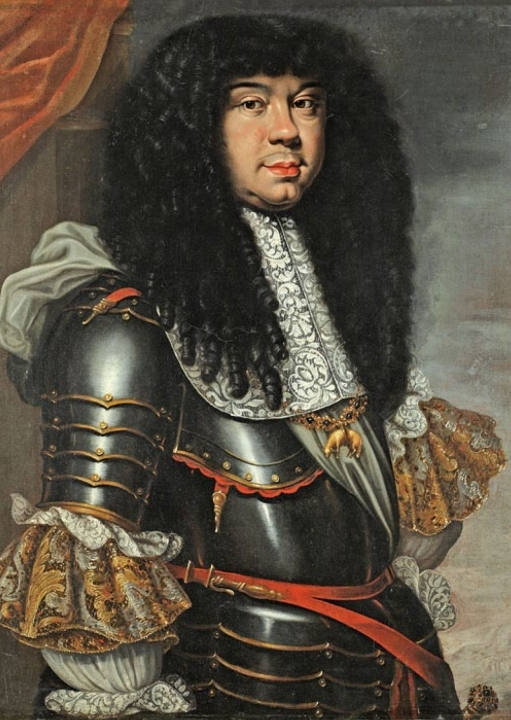

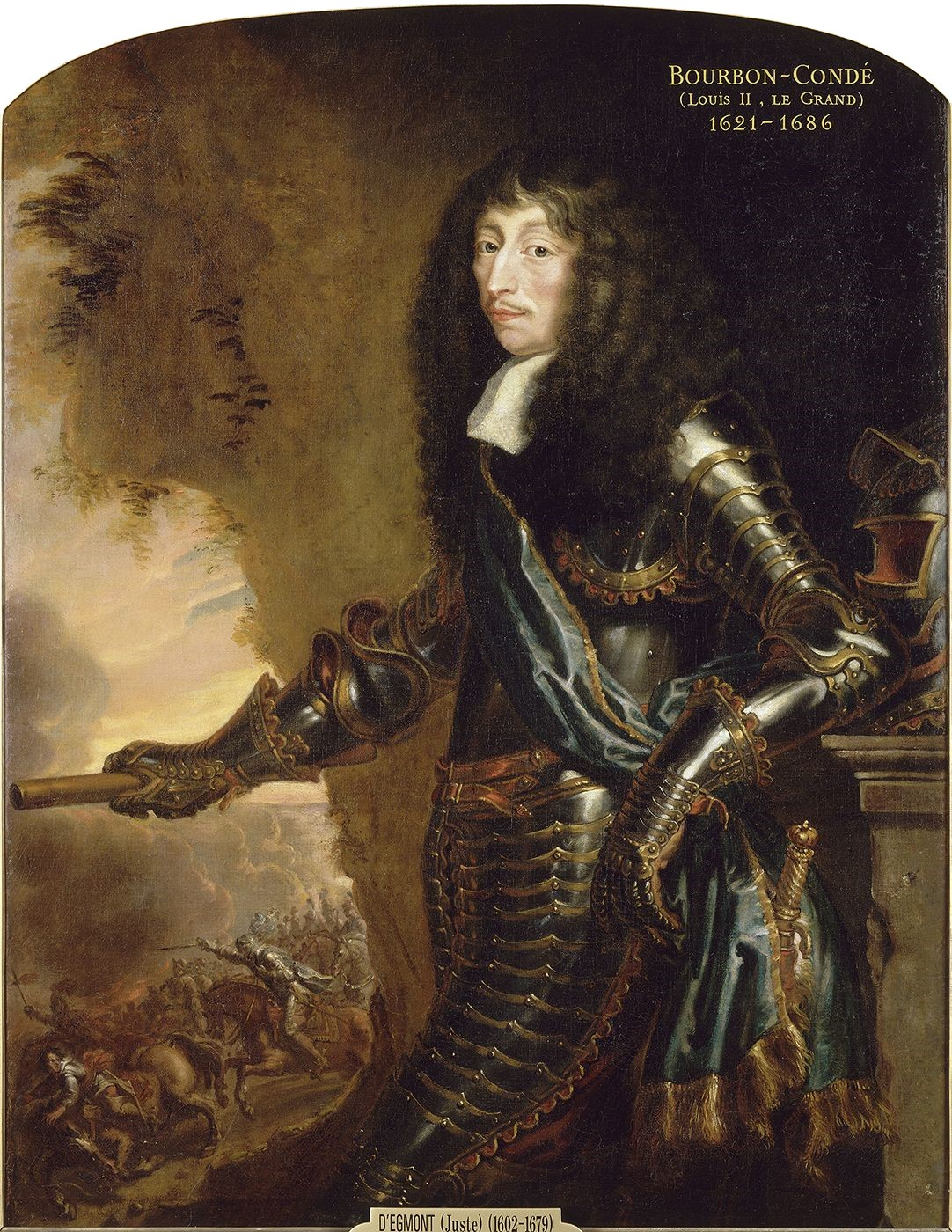

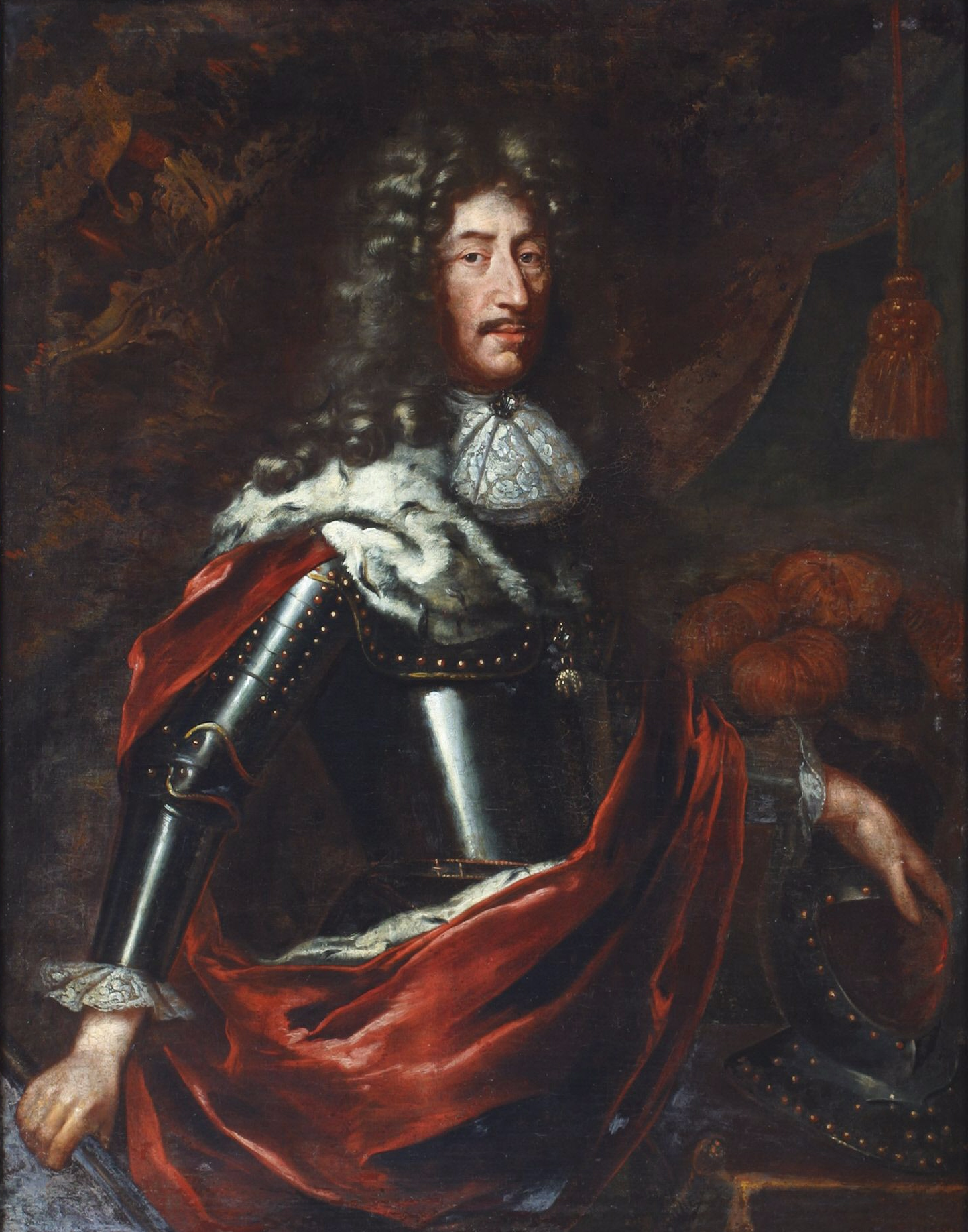

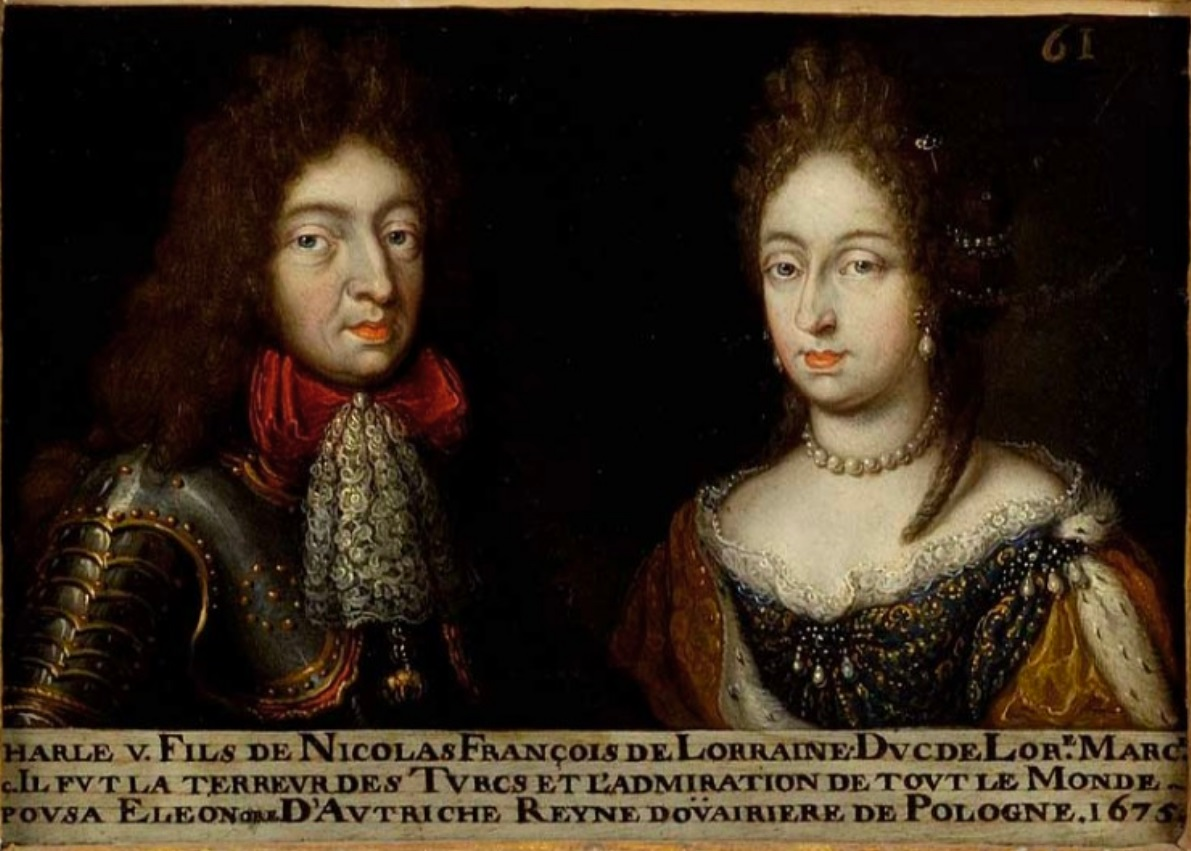
Candidate	Michał Korybut Wiśniowiecki	Louis de Bourbon, Prince of Condé
Faction	Piast	Pro-French
Result	Elected	Defeated
Candidate	Philipp Wilhelm, Count Palatine of Neuburg	Charles Léopold de Lorraine
Faction	Pro-French	Pro-Habsburg
Result	Defeated	Defeated
King before election
John II Casimir
Elected King
Michael I

The 1669 Polish–Lithuanian royal election was an election to decide on the new candidate for the Polish–Lithuanian throne.

== Background ==
On 16 September 1668, King John II Casimir abdicated the Polish–Lithuanian throne. He left for France and joined the Jesuits where he became Abbot of Saint-Germain-des-Prés Abbey in Paris which resulted in the Polish–Lithuanian Commonwealth being left without a monarch, making an election necessary.

== History ==
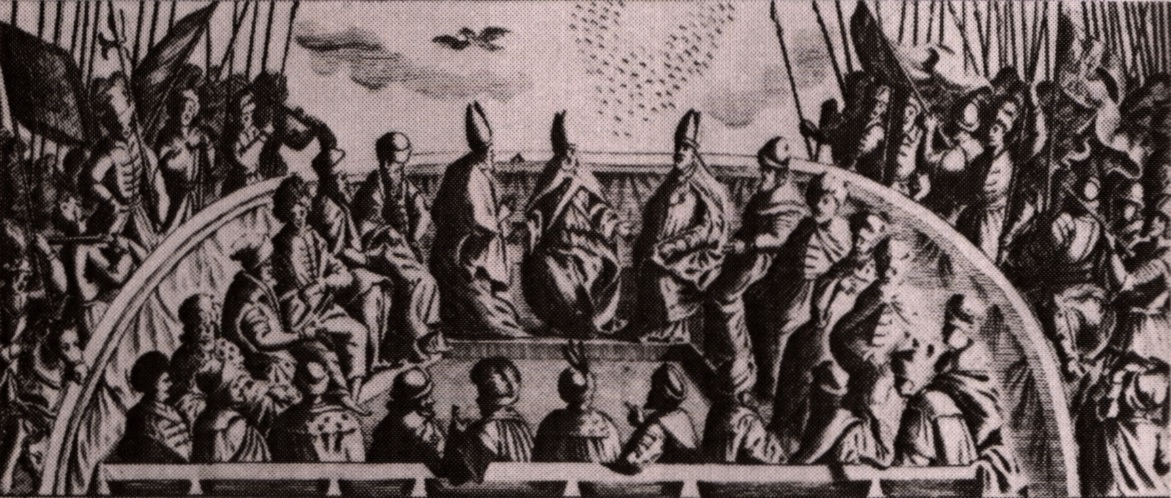
Election of Michał Korybut Wiśniowiecki.

The pro-French faction, which was backed by Michal Prazmowski and Crown Hetman Jan Sobieski, was strong. During the Convocation, several Sejm members of the szlachta urged the election of a native Piast king instead. There were widespread rumors that supporters of foreign candidates had been bribed. Under the circumstances, the Bishop of Chełmno, Andrzej Olszowski, suggested that instead of a foreigner, a Pole should be elected. Olszowski suggested the candidacy of Michał Korybut Wiśniowiecki, who was the son of legendary Ruthenian magnate, Jeremi Wiśniowiecki. Michał Korybut, an exceptional individual, received the backing of the Szlachta who were afraid of growing French influences. Local sejmiks urged the nobility to come to Warsaw as pospolite ruszenie.

The election, which took place in May and June 1669 in Wola, near Warsaw, is regarded as the epitome of szlachta anarchy (see Golden Liberty). After heated arguments on 6 June, a crowd of electors forced senators to void the candidacy of Louis, Grand Condé. Some senators tried to oppose, but most gave way to the threats and eventually supported the Bishop of Kujawy, Florian Czartoryski.

On 17 June some districts of Warsaw burned and rumors soon spread that the fire was intentionally set. Szlachta surrounded the wooden shed in which the senators convened, accusing them of treason and conspiring with foreign envoys. Shots were fired, with Jan Chryzostom Pasek later writing in his diaries that bishops and senators had hidden themselves under chairs and carriages.

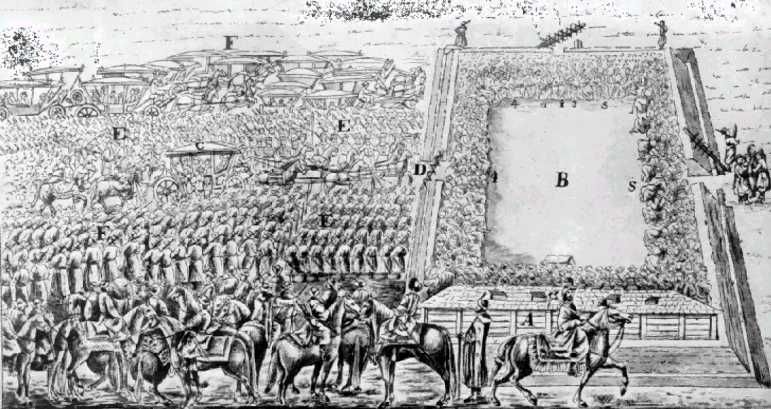
Plan of the elective camp.

Two days later, on 19 June, Wiśniowiecki was elected the new king. Even though Wisniowiecki won the support of the majority of electors, a faction led by Prazmowski and Sobieski continued to oppose him. The Crowning by the Sejm, which took place in Kraków, was dismissed. The Commonwealth, which suffered from continuous Crimean Tatar raids, was on the brink of civil war. The outbreak of the Polish–Ottoman War (1672–76) however ended internal conflicts.

== See also ==
- History of Poland in the Early Modern era (1569–1795)
- Royal elections in Poland
- Golden Liberty
- Henrician Articles

== Sources ==
- Historia Polski, 1572–1795 at the Internet Archive
- M. Markiewicz, Historia Polski 1494–1795, Kraków 2002
- Stone, D.Z. (2014) The Polish-Lithuanian state, 1386–1795
