= 1573 Polish–Lithuanian royal election =

Royal election in the Polish–Lithuanian Commonwealth

1573 Polish-Lithuanian Free election
- April 5, 1573 – May 16, 1573
- Turnout: 40,000–50,000
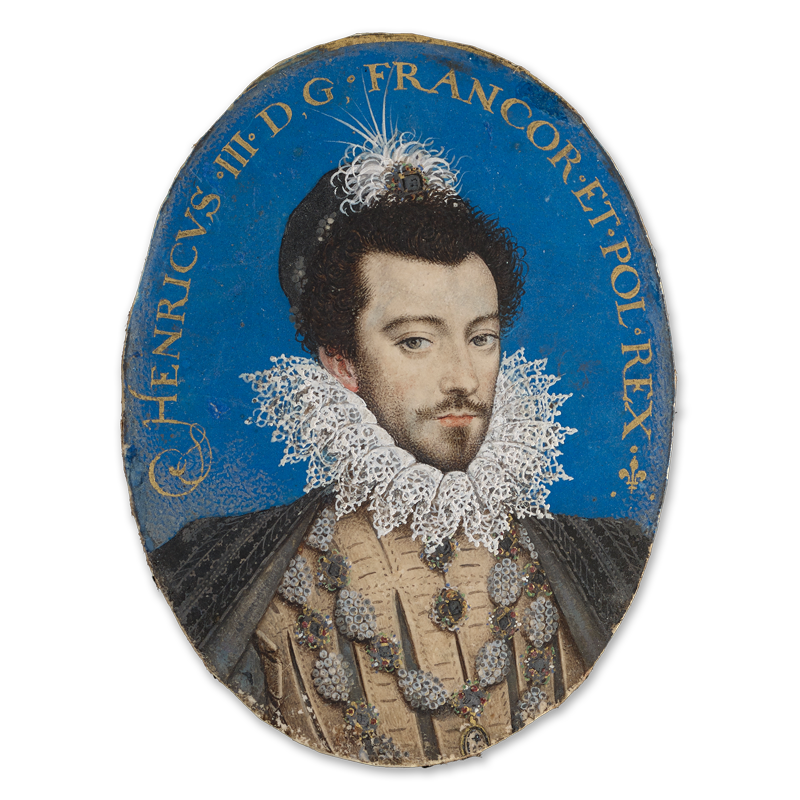

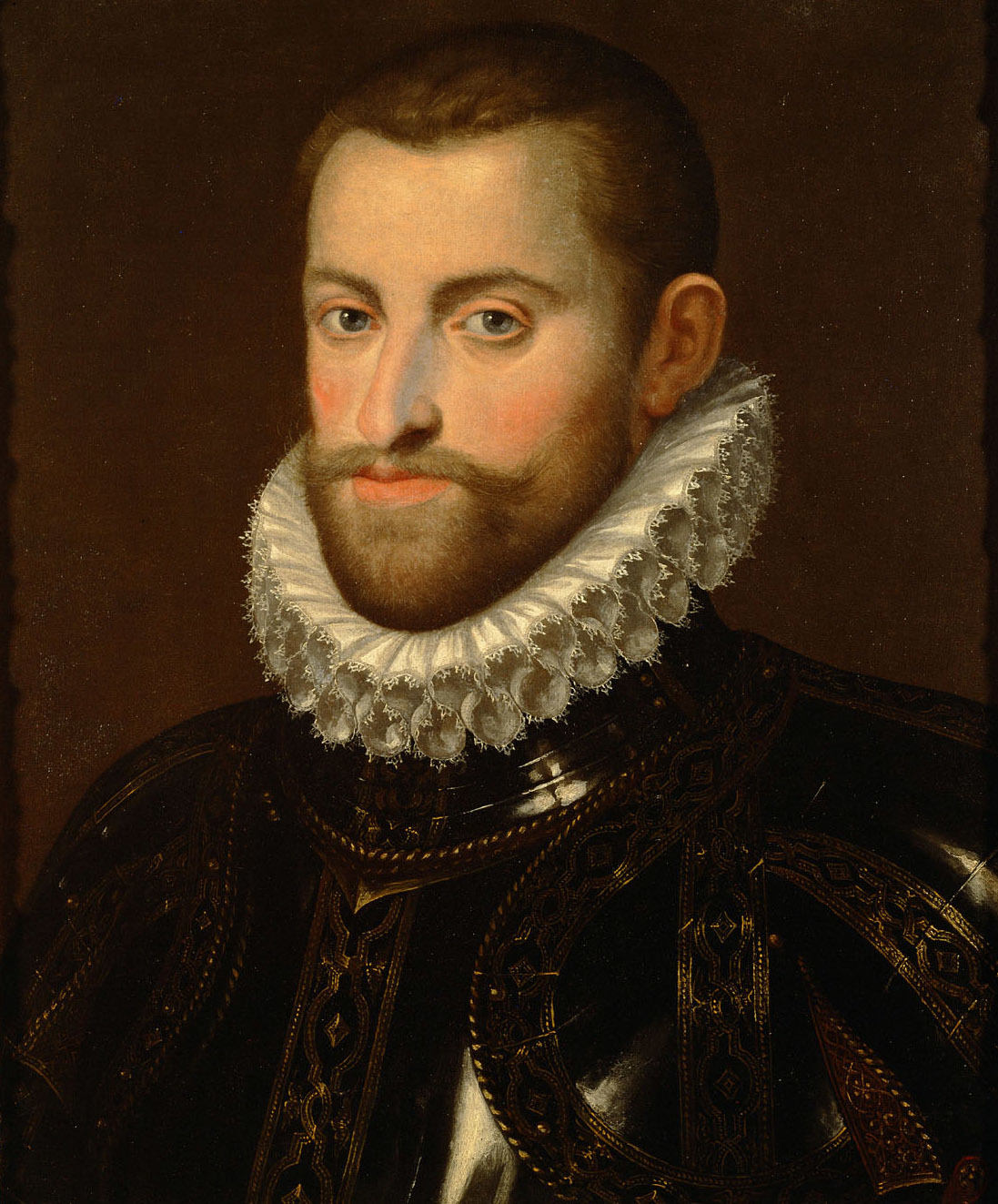

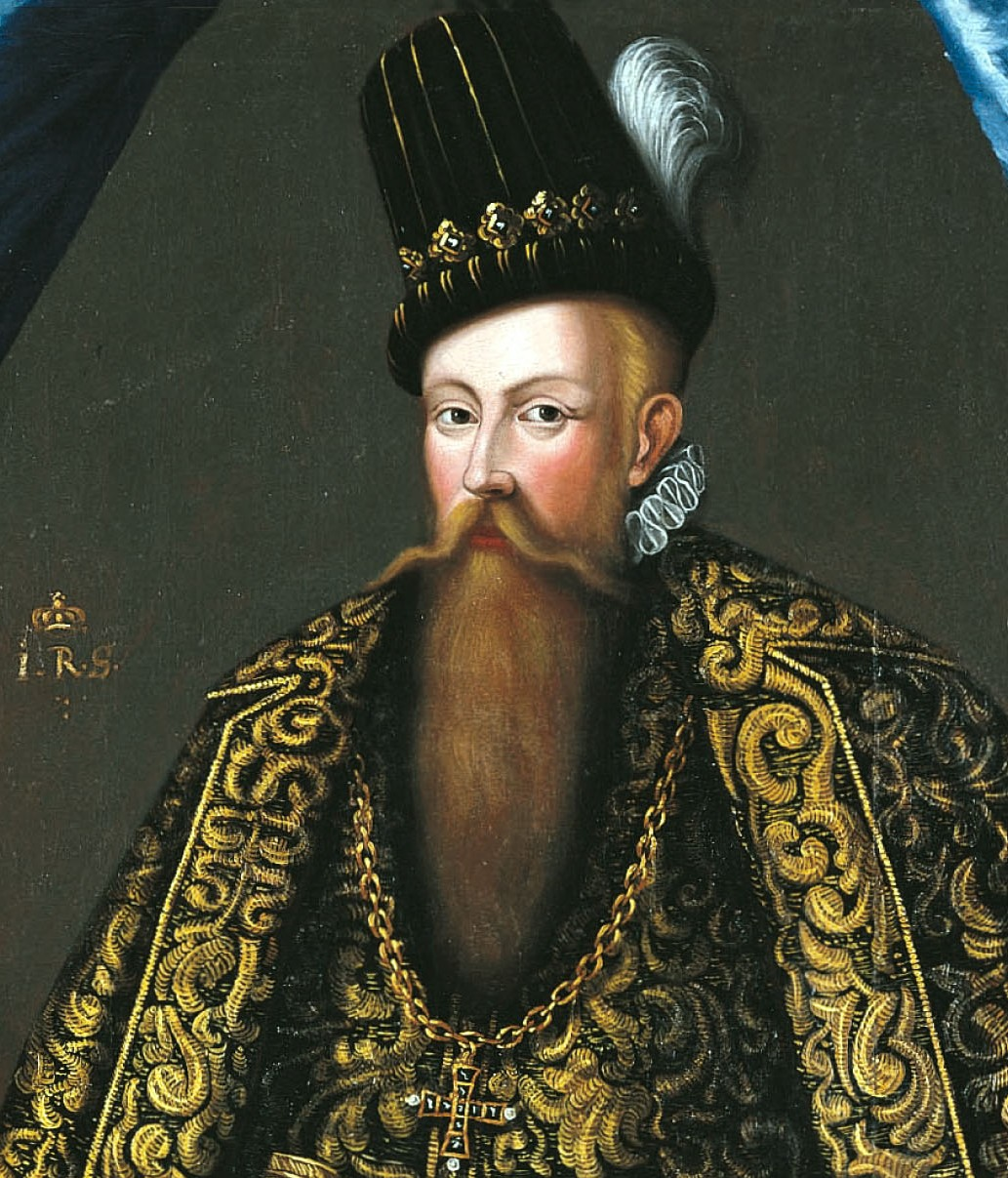

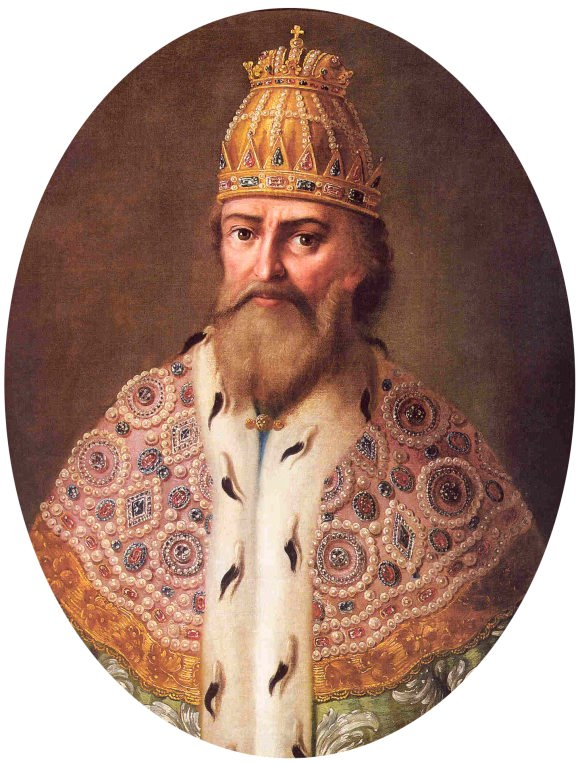
Candidate	Henri de Valois	Archduke Ernst von Habsburg
Faction	Pro-French	Pro-Habsburg
Result	Elected	Defeated
Candidate	Johan III of Sweden	Ivan the Terrible
Faction	Protestant	Lithuanian
Result	Defeated	Defeated
King before election
Sigismund II Augustus
Elected King
Henri de Valois

The free election of 1573 was the first ever royal election to be held in the Polish–Lithuanian Commonwealth. It attracted an estimated 40,000–50,000 szlachta (Polish nobility) voters (the highest turnout ever) who elected Henry of Valois king.

The free election was introduced due to the childless death of the last Jagiellonian monarch Sigismund II Augustus and the lack of a potential candidate that would satisfy most of the nobles. Even though that kind of half-democratic election soon proved to be weakening the power of both the king and the state, it was not abolished until the Constitution of May 3, 1791 was established.

Henry I of Poland ruled only for a single year after which he returned to his native France, as he had become the new French king after the death of his brother. The next election took place in 1576.

== Background ==
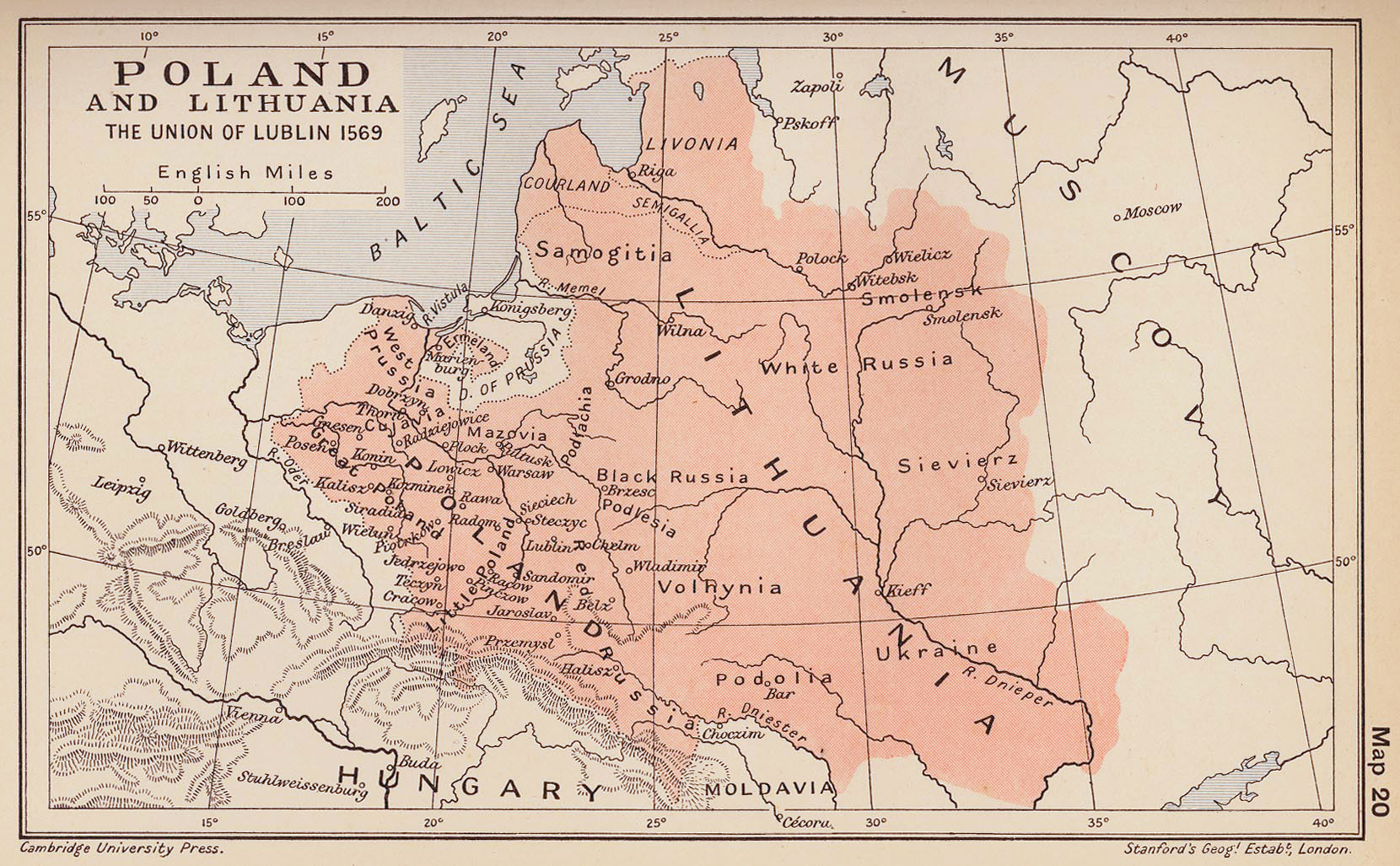
Map of Poland and Lithuania in 1573

The death of King Zygmunt August (July 7, 1572), was not a surprise for the Polish–Lithuanian Commonwealth nobility. The King had been sick since spring of that year, and probably died of pneumonia. Zygmunt August did not have a son, so Polish throne was left empty, and no legal regulations existed to specify election of a new monarch. Furthermore, several internal problems existed in the enormous country. Lithuanian nobility demanded revision of the Union of Lublin, and return of Podlasie, Volhynia, Podolia, and Kiev, which had been incorporated into the Crown of Poland. Furthermore, there were conflicts between Catholics and Protestants, magnates and szlachta, and two great Polish provinces—Lesser Poland and Greater Poland.

Before the death of Zygmunt August, Greater Poland Catholic nobility, gathered in Lowicz, decided that during the interregnum, the Commonwealth should be temporarily ruled by the Primate of Poland and Archbishop of Gniezno, Jakub Uchanski. At the same time, Lesser Poland Calvinist nobility supported the notion that Calvinist Voivode of Kraków and most important lay senator, Jan Firlej should become the interrex. Also, nobility from both Polish provinces disagreed about the election itself. Lesser Poland supported the so-called electio viritim movement, in which all members of the nobility would be eligible to vote for the future king. On the other hand, Greater Poland nobility claimed that electio viritim would be chaotic, and that the king should be elected by chosen representatives. Electio viritim was supported by magnates from Red Ruthenia, Jan Zamoyski, and Mikolaj Sienicki.

== Convocation Sejm ==
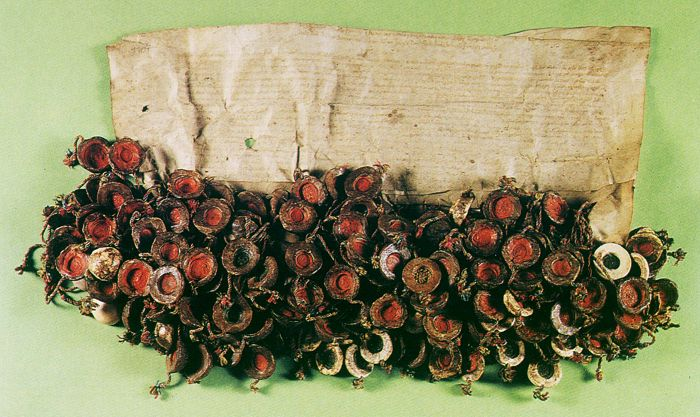
Act of the Warsaw Confederation of 1573

On January 6, 1573, the Convocation Sejm was summoned to Warsaw. Members of nobility argued that it was under extensive influence of the Senate, so to prevent this, no Marshal was elected. Instead, the work of the Sejm was overseen by deputies from different provinces. After lengthy discussion, it was agreed that all members of the nobility would be eligible to elect the monarch, provided that they personally come to Warsaw.

The decision to choose Warsaw was seen as a success of the Catholic camp, as unlike Lesser Poland, Mazovia was dominated by Roman Catholic nobility. Lithuanians did not appear at the Convocation Sejm, sending only their observers. Once again, they demanded the return of Ruthenian provinces, but did not decide to void the Union of Lublin, due to threat from Ivan the Terrible.

== Candidates ==
Initially, Archduke Ernest of Austria was regarded as the most important candidate for the Polish-Lithuanian throne. Supported by Roman Catholic clergy and Primate Uchanski, along with the Habsburg monarchy and Spain (which sent Gifts, Money and American Gold to the electors, wanting to restore the good Poland-Spain relations after the controversy of the Neapolitan sums, and the fear of a restored Franco-Polish Alliance that, complemented with Franco-Ottoman alliance and the simultaneous attempts to propose a pro-French Holy Roman Emperor, could isolate the Spanish Empire in Central Europe and the Mediterranean), he was however disliked by the szlachta, which was afraid that Ernest would introduce Habsburg-style government, based on aristocracy. Furthermore, at that time the Habsburg monarchy was in a never-ending conflict with the Ottoman Empire, and Polish nobility feared that the Commonwealth would be drawn into the war. Also, Protestants were afraid that Ernest would limit religious tolerance. Polish–Lithuanian Protestants, on the other hand, supported John III of Sweden, the husband of Catherine Jagellon.

Another candidate was the Tsar of Muscovy, Ivan the Terrible, supported mostly by the Lithuanians, who hoped that his election would end the Muscovite–Lithuanian Wars. Ivan himself initially did not express any interest in the Polish-Lithuanian throne, neither for himself, nor for his son. Later on, however, he presented a list of unrealistic demands, such as incorporation of vast territories of the Commonwealth, and creation of a Polish-Lithuanian-Muscovite state, with a hereditary monarch. Since he did not send any envoys to Warsaw, his candidacy failed.

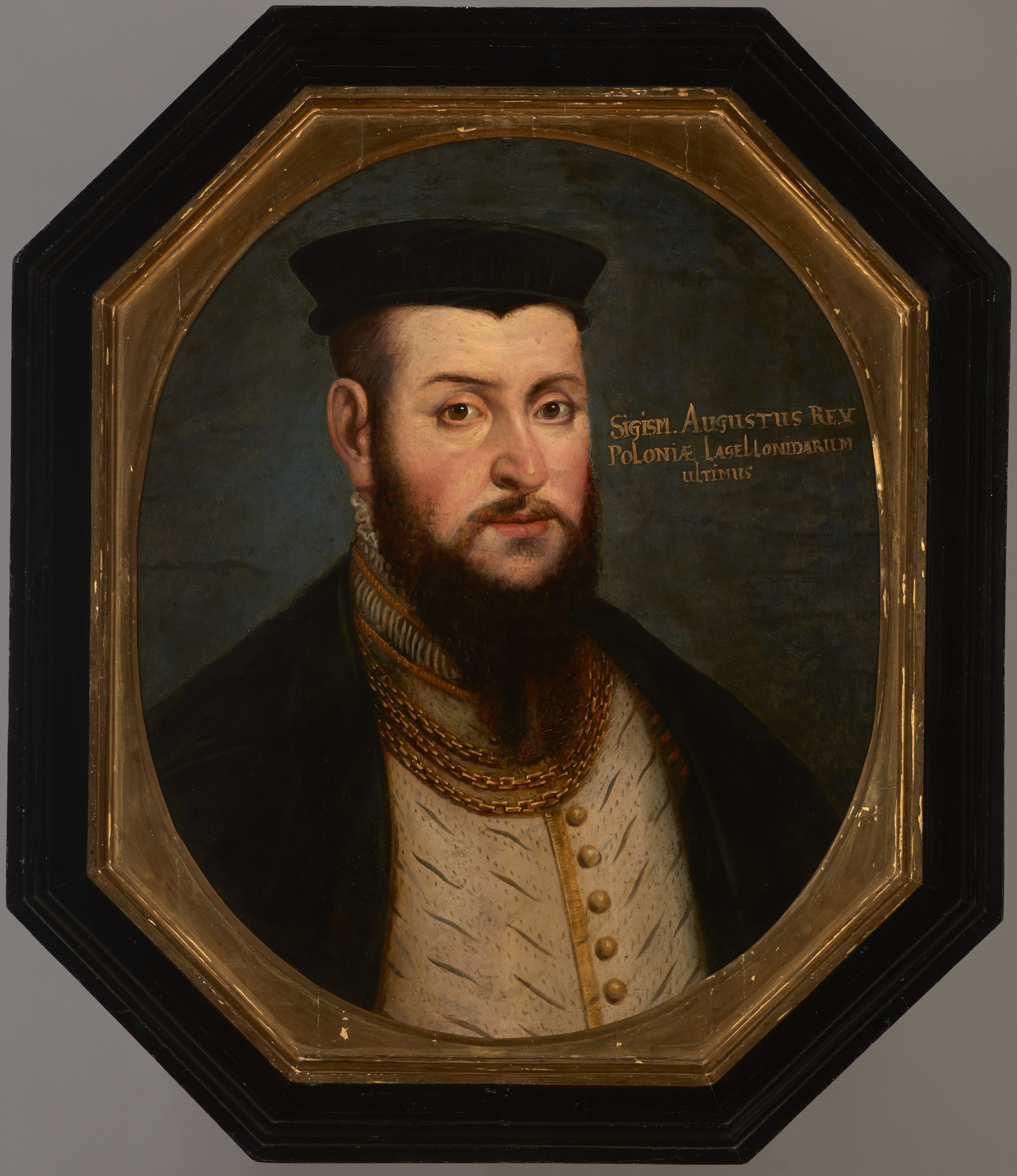
King Zygmunt II August

Henry of Valois, the brother of Charles IX of France, emerged as a possible candidate in the final years of the reign of Zygmunt August. He was supported by the pro-French circles among Polish nobility, which hoped to reduce Habsburg influences, end wars with Ottoman Empire, a traditional French ally, and profit from lucrative Baltic Sea trade with France. The French court also expressed interest in this idea. In August 1572, Paris sent to the Commonwealth an official delegation, headed by Bishop of Valence, Jean de Montluc. The French were also supported by an influential Papal legate, Giovanni Francesco Commendone.

== The election ==
The Election Sejm convened on April 5, 1573, in the village of Kamien near Warsaw. Due to prolonged winter, nobility from distant provinces was largely absent, while Mazovians appeared in great numbers. Sejm deliberated in a senatorial tent, around which gathered szlachta, divided into provinces (voivodeships). Deputies discussed all candidatures, including that of Albert Frederick, Duke of Prussia. Among the nobility, the idea of a “Piast” king was very popular. This was however ridiculed by Piotr Opalinski, who suggested that an unknown man named Wawrzyniec Bandura Slupski, who resided in the area of Bydgoszcz, be elected new king.

Bribes were common in the election. French envoys promised up to 50,000 écus to important people in Poland-Lithuania as bribes but by the end of the election, the amounts were promised to be 100,000. Habsburg envoys did the same. Though Holy Roman Emperor Maximilian II was in a much tighter spot financially, likely due to constant warring in Germany, he had offered 100,000 gulden to Piotr Zborowski, a Polish voivode, and had also offered Jan Chodkiewicz a principality, if he would vote to install a Habsburg onto the Polish throne. The same Jan Chodkiewicz had also been offered money by the French. At the end, 24,000 signatures of bribed nobles were found.

In the course of time, the candidature of Henri of Valois, promoted by Jean de Montluc, became very popular. A brilliant, three hour speech of de Montluc, filled with promises and assurances, was enthusiastically welcomed by the szlachta. The speech was later printed in 1,500 copies, and distributed among those who came to Kamien. Henri was supported by Anna Jagiellon, and the Lithuanians, who hoped for a revision of the Union of Lublin.

The Election Sejm dragged for a long time, due to several issues which were discussed. In early May 1573, Mazovian nobility, which grew impatient, demanded that the Primate of Poland begin the election. On May 3, the vote began, and by May 9 it turned out that French candidate won support of 22 voivodeships. On May 10, opponents of Henri, led by Jan Firlej, left Kamien and headed to Grochow. To prevent a double election, a delegation under Piotr Zborowski was sent there. Firlej and his men agreed to the election of the Frenchman only after signing the so-called Henrician Articles.

On May 11, 1573, Primate Uchanski nominated Henri of Valois to the post of King of Poland and Grand Duke of Lithuania. On May 16, French envoys accepted the Henrician Articles and other demands, and on the same day Crown Marshal Jan Firlej named Henry King of Poland. Valois was crowned in Kraków on February 21, 1574.

== See also ==
- History of Poland in the Early Modern era (1569–1795)
- Royal elections in Poland
- Golden Liberty
- Henrician Articles

== Sources ==
- S. Grzybowski, Dzieje Polski i Litwy (1506–1648), pod red. S. Grodziskiego, w: Wielka Historia Polski, Kraków 2003
- U. Augustyniak, Historia Polski 1572–1795, Warszawa 2008
- S. Cynarski, Zygmunt August, Wrocław 2004
- Z. Wójcik, Wiek XVI-XVII, Warszawa 1991
- M. Markiewicz, Historia Polski 1494–1795, Kraków 2002
