= Edict of Wieluń =

The Edict of Wieluń was a 1424 law issued in Wieluń by King of Poland Władysław II Jagiełło under pressure from the Catholic Church. The edict outlawed Hussitism and represented a temporary regression for the Kingdom of Poland, which had a long tradition of religious toleration.

Upon the law, participation of citizens of Poland in the Hussite movement was punished as high treason. Properties of Poles residing in Bohemia were to be confiscated if they did not return to Poland in a defined time. Furthermore, they were to lose their noble status. Another purpose of the edict was to warn citizens of Poland that any contacts with Hussites were to be punished as an offence against the dignity of the King. Local starostas and courts were ordered to prosecute all suspects and hand them over to church courts.

Excerpts of the Edict of Wieluń:

"We, Wladyslaw, by the grace of God King of Poland, state that whoever in our Kingdom of Poland and in our lands turns out to be a heretic or a supporter of heresy, this person must be captured by our starostas and other civil servants, as well as all our subjects. This person shall be regarded as offender of our Majesty, and shall be punished accordingly to their offence (...) If any of our subjects neglected to return from Bohemia until the coming holiday, this person shall be regarded as a heretic, and punished as a heretic. All his properties shall be confiscated by our treasury, and his offspring shall be deprived of all honors and status (...) We also forbid all merchants and other persons from transporting all goods, including lead, weapons and foods, to and from Bohemia".

Signed in Wieluń on the White Sunday (April 9), Anno Domini 1424.

== Sources ==
- Whole text of the Edict of Wielun (in Polish)

== See also ==
- Warsaw Confederation
- Statute of Kalisz
- Sandomierz Agreement
- Polish brethren
