= Warsaw Confederation =

1573 statute on religious freedom in the Polish–Lithuanian Commonwealth

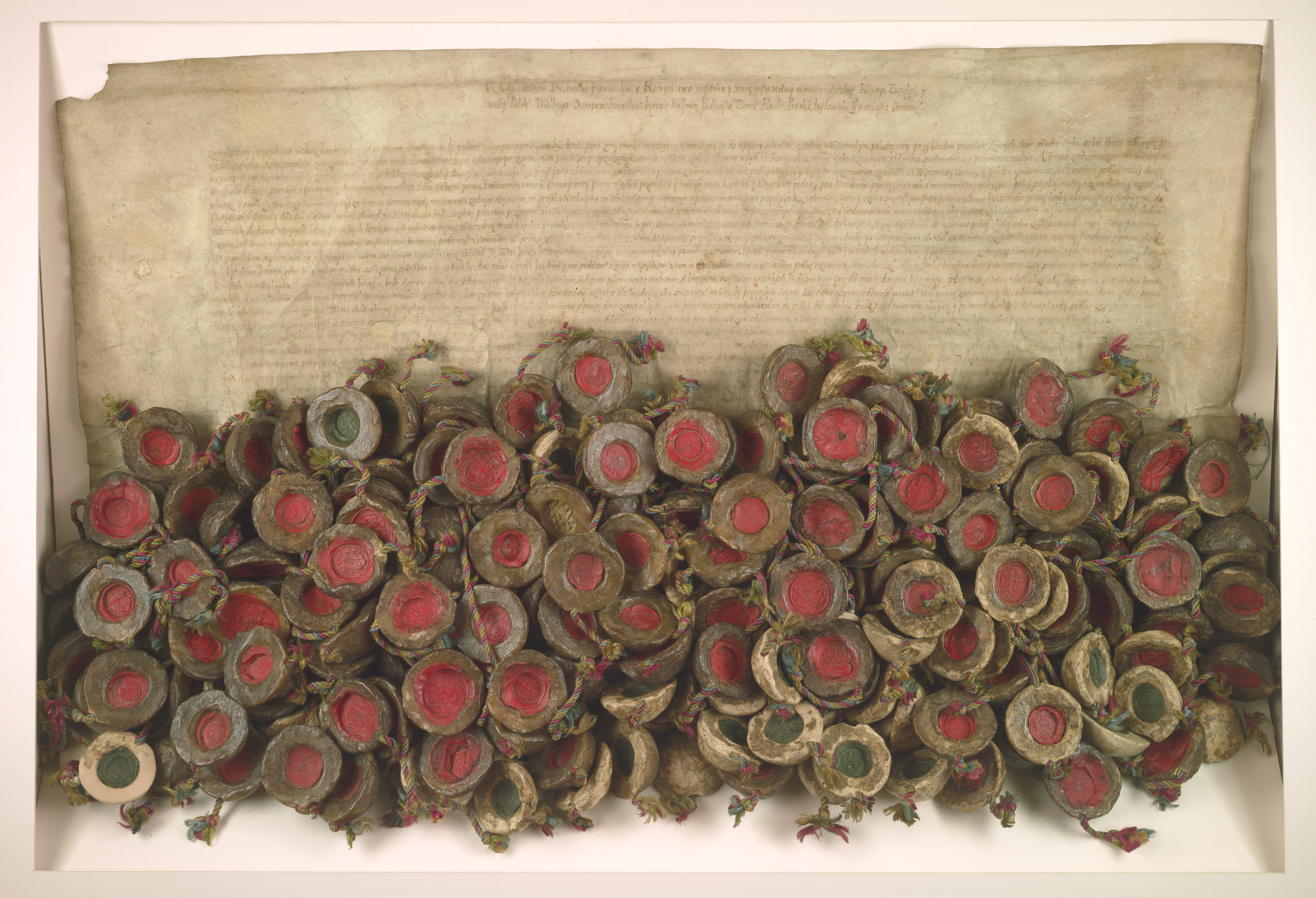
Original act of the Warsaw Confederation, signed on 28 January 1573, by just over 200 members of the legislature, each with their wax seal.

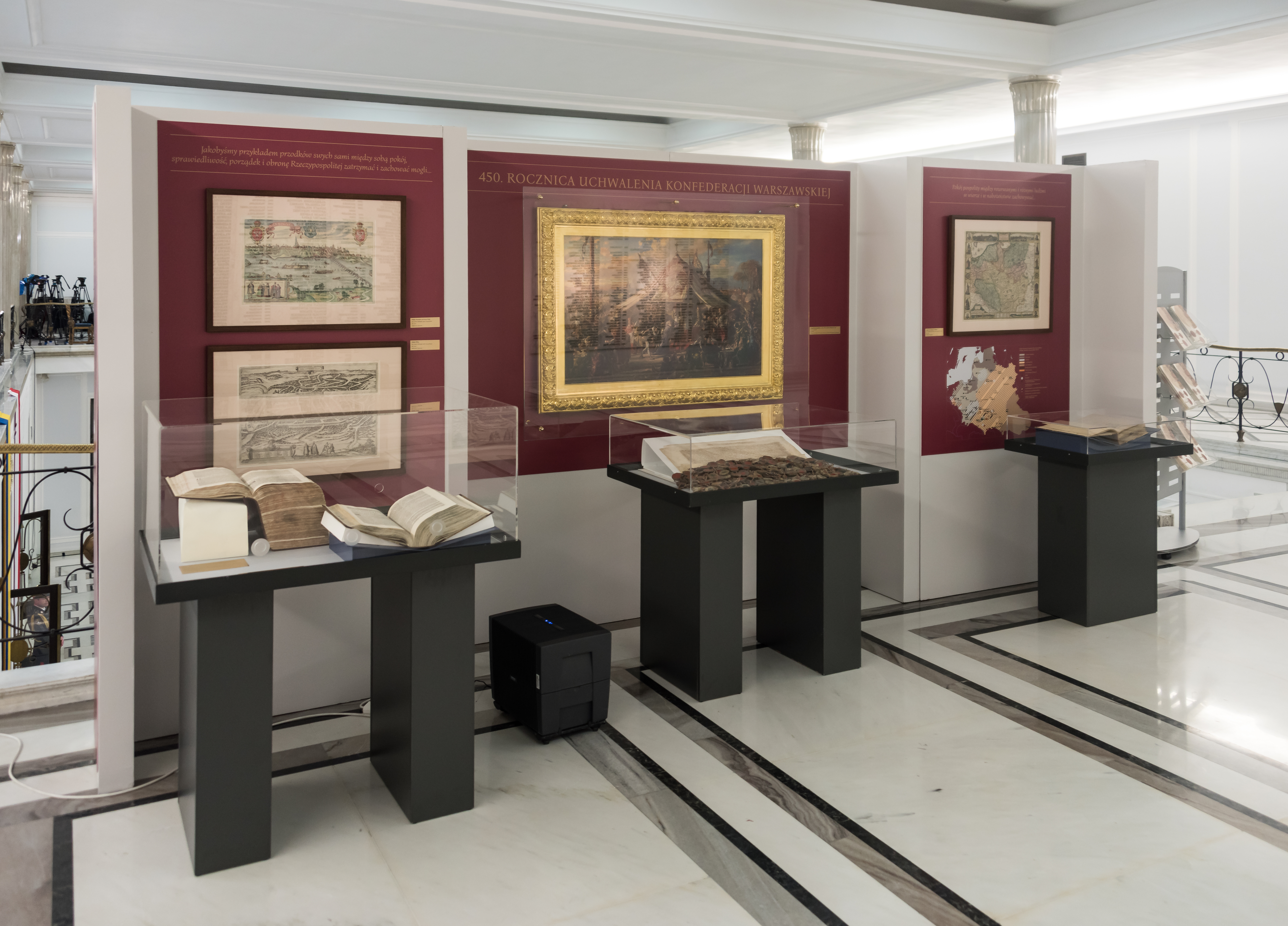
Exhibition commemorating the 450th anniversary of the Warsaw Confederation in the Sejm (parliament) building, Warsaw, 2023. The parchment manuscript with attached wax seals is displayed in the centre glass display unit.

The Warsaw Confederation, also called the Compact of Warsaw, was a political-legal act concluded in Warsaw by the first Convocation Sejm (Sejm konwokacyjny) of the Polish–Lithuanian Commonwealth and formally promulgated in Kraków on 28 January 1573. Convened and deliberating as a confederation between 6 and 29 January 1573, during the Commonwealth's first interregnum (1572–1574), the Sejm sought to establish a general confederation to secure continuity of governance and prepare for the election of a new king. The confederation also aimed to enact a guarantee of religious tolerance, ensuring the political equality of dissenters with Catholics. It is regarded as one of the first European acts to grant freedom of religion.

It was an important development in the history of Poland and Lithuania, extending religious tolerance to the nobility and free persons (burghers, the townspeople of royal cities) within the Polish–Lithuanian Commonwealth. This event is considered the formal beginning of religious freedom in the Commonwealth. Although the confederation initially granted religious freedom primarily to the nobility, it was also embraced in practice by the townspeople of royal cities. This groundbreaking act marked a significant milestone not just for the Commonwealth but for the entire continent, as it was one of the first European acts granting broad religious freedoms.

The text of the Warsaw Confederation was originally written in multiple languages: the original in Classical Latin and Old Polish (mixed-language manuscript), with translations in Ruthenian, Early New High German, and Middle French (intended for Prince Henry of Valois who would be crowned King of Poland and Grand Duke of Lithuania). This multilingual approach ensured that the document could be understood by a diverse audience within the Commonwealth and beyond.

While the confederation could not prevent all religious conflicts and tensions within the state, it guaranteed religious tolerance, civil rights, and political equality to religious minorities, the so-called dissenters (dissidentes de religione), who did not follow the dominant Roman Catholic state religion. At the same time, it ensured internal peace and stability in the Commonwealth, especially during a time of great religious upheavals in 16th and 17th century Europe, which culminated in events such as the bloody Huguenot Wars and the devastating Thirty Years' War.

== Origin ==
=== History of religious tolerance in Poland ===
Religious tolerance in Poland has a long tradition (e.g., Statute of Kalisz), and influenced by two significant documents issued by King Casimir III the Great. On 30 August 1356, the king approved customs, freedoms, and privileges in the realm of worship and administrative matters for the Monophysite Armenians. In a document from 1341, he guaranteed the followers of the Orthodox Church respect for their rites and customs. This stance by King Casimir made Poland the first multi-denominational state in Europe, where the royal court was Roman Catholic. However, tolerance for schismatics did not extend to heresies that arose within the Catholic Church. The Edict of Wieluń by King Władysław II Jagiełło in 1424 recognised Hussitism as a crime against the state. Nonetheless, in the same century, the Orthodox nobility enjoyed the same privileges as the Catholic nobility, as did the Armenians in Poland. Certain restrictions on the access of Orthodox Christians to the highest offices in the Grand Duchy of Lithuania were lifted by King Sigismund II of Poland in 1563 and 1568. In addition to the Orthodox and Armenians, Lipka Tatars, Ashkenazi Jews, and Crimean Karaites living in some cities and more numerous Lithuanian villages also enjoyed tolerance in Poland–Lithuania.

In opposition to the prevailing principles in Western Europe, a doctrine regarding the state's relationship with pagans was formed in Poland in the 15th century, represented by Bishop Andrzej Łaskarz of Poznań and Paweł Włodkowic from the Kraków Academy (Jagiellonian University). In the early years of the Protestant Reformation, royal edicts against reformers were issued, but their implementation was far from perfect. King Sigismund I the Old himself recognised not only the secularisation of the Duchy of Prussia in 1525 but also, as the first ruler, recognised Lutheranism in Prussia as an official religion, guaranteeing tolerance for Catholics. Bishop Andrzej Krzycki, defending the Treaty of Kraków of 1525, referred to the fact that in Poland, alongside Catholics, Ruthenians, Armenians, Ashkenazi Jews, and Lipka Tatars had long lived together in harmony; in this community, there was also a place for Lutherans in the Duchy of Prussia.

Anabaptists, who arrived in Poland in 1535, and Mennonites, who appeared in Poland in 1526, also received tolerance. In the years 1557–1559, King Sigismund II Augustus guaranteed the cities of Prussia the freedom of the Augsburg Confession, and in the Treaty of Vilnius of 1561, Livonia received the same privilege, where the king guaranteed the nobility and townspeople freedom of the Lutheran Confession while simultaneously ensuring tolerance for Catholicism.

=== Sandomierz Agreement to the Warsaw Confederation ===
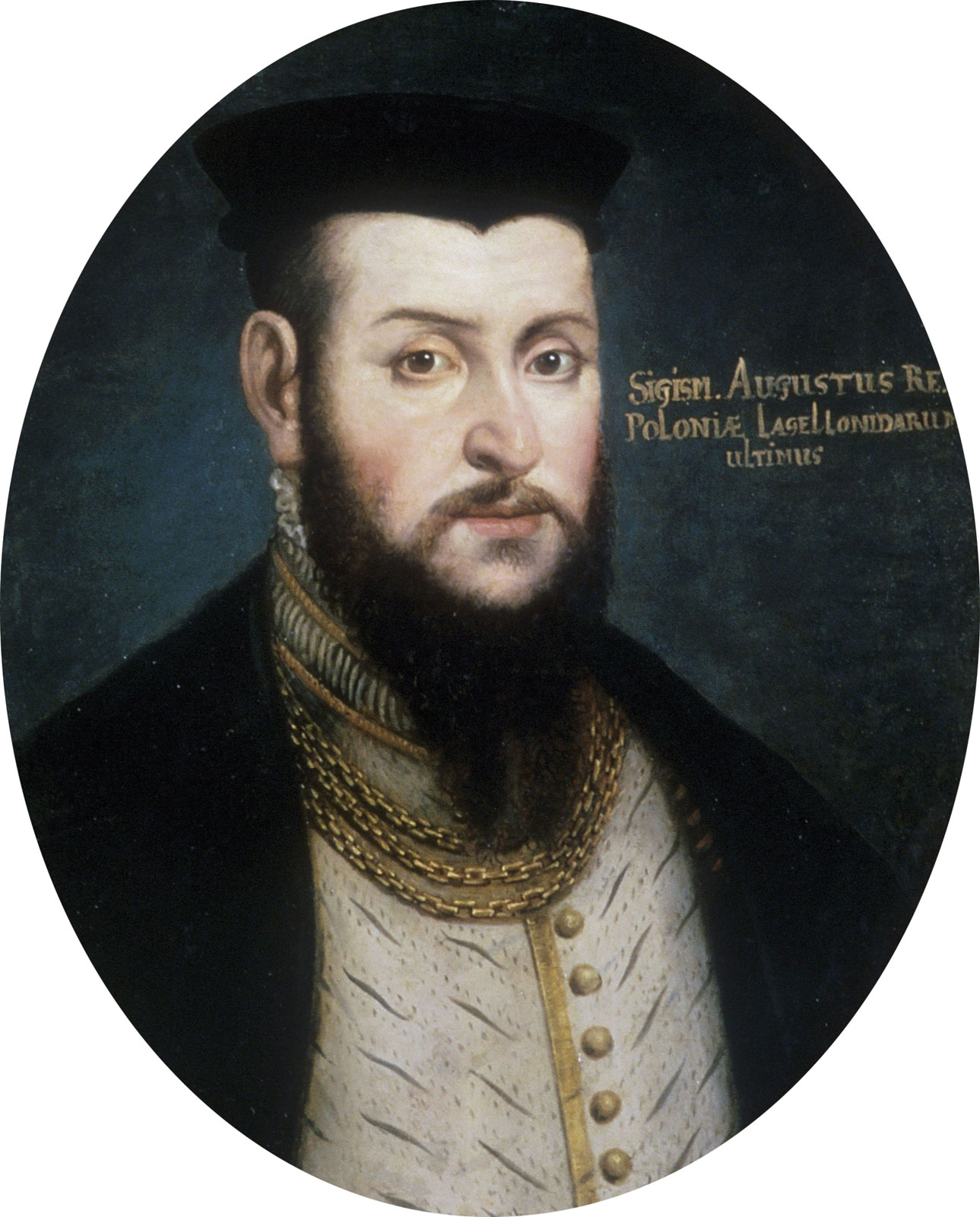
Portrait of Sigismund II Augustus, King of Poland and Grand Duke of Lithuania, and from 1569 the first ruler of the Polish-Lithuanian Commonwealth. During his reign from 1548 to 1572, religious freedom was a royal decree.

In 1570, representatives of Lutherans, Calvinists, and the Bohemian Brethren residing in the Commonwealth gathered in Sandomierz, where they reached an agreement to mutually recognize each other as Christian denominations and to jointly oppose the Catholic majority. They excluded the Arians (Polish Brethren) from their group, deeming them heretics. The dissenters presented a draft constitution (the Sandomierz Agreement) to the Sejm (parliament) in 1570, guaranteeing freedom of religion for all, so that "everyone may believe according to their conscience" on an equal footing with Roman Catholics and Orthodox Christians. However, this draft was not accepted at that time.

Meanwhile, on 7 July 1572, following the childless death of the last king, Sigismund II Augustus of the Jagiellonian dynasty, the Protestant camp, facing a new election for a new king, found itself without legal guarantees for their faith. The matter of choosing a new king was crucial for both sides, as in Europe, kings determined the religious character of their kingdom. Catholics rallied around Bishop Stanisław Karnkowski of Kuyavia. The Roman Catholic primate of Poland Jakub Uchański was a supporter of church reform, which brought him closer to the Protestants. The dissenters were led by grand marshal Jan Firlej and the Voivode of Sandomierz Piotr Zborowski. Fearing pressure from the numerous Mazovian nobility loyal to the Catholic Church, the Protestants decided that the election of the new king should take place in Bystrzyca near Lublin, hoping that the Protestant nobility of Lublin would influence the future election. The Catholics, on the other hand, aimed for the election to be held near Warsaw due to the numerous Catholic Mazovian nobility.

Religious tolerance in Poland had been de facto policy during the reign of King Sigismund II Augustus. However, the articles signed by the Confederation gave official sanction to earlier customs. In that sense, they may be considered either the beginning or the peak of Polish tolerance.

=== Formation of the Warsaw Confederation ===
Religious situation in the Polish–Lithuanian Commonwealth in 1573 - Catholicism circumscribed in the red dashed border line (beige highlights the dominant regions), Lutherans in grey, Calvinists in purple, Orthodox in green, and remainder symbols indicating: Arians (Polish Brethren), Anabaptists and Mennonites.

The Convocation Sejm (parliament), acting as the Confederation Legislature, was composed of approximately 200 high-ranking nobles (the szlachta) from Poland and Lithuania. They gathered at Warsaw to prevent any separatists from acting and to maintain the existing legal order. To achieve this, the citizens had to unconditionally abide by the decisions made by the body, and the Confederation was a potent declaration that the two former states were still closely linked. At the Convocation Sejm (January 1573), it was decided that every nobleman (viritim) from the Commonwealth could participate in electing a new king, although attendance was not obligatory. Warsaw was designated as the place of election. Another victory for the Catholics was the recognition of the Roman Catholic primate of Poland, Jakub Uchański, as interrex, who would henceforth convene assemblies, appoint, and crown the king. The Grand Marshal, who was then the Calvinist Jan Firlej, was granted the right to announce the election of the new king.

On 28 January 1573, the Confederation Legislature signed the Warsaw Confederation in which representatives of all the major religions pledged mutual support and tolerance. A new political system was arising, aided by the Confederation, the so-called nobles democracy, which contributed to the Commonwealth's stability. Religious tolerance was an important factor in a multiethnic and multi-religious state, as the territories of the Commonwealth were inhabited by many generations of people from different ethnic backgrounds (Poles, Lithuanians, Ruthenians, Germans, Armenians, Italians, Lipka Tatars, and Ashkenazi Jews) and of different denominations (Roman Catholic, Protestant, Orthodox, Lutheran, Calvinist, Polish Brethren, Monophysite Armenians, Judaism, and even Muslim communities in Poland and in Lithuania). This kingdom became what Cardinal Stanislaus Hosius called "a place of shelter for heretics". It was a place where the most radical religious sects, trying to escape persecution in other regions of the Christian world, sought refuge.

This act was not imposed by a government or as a consequence of war but rather resulted from the actions of members of Polish-Lithuanian society. It was also influenced by the 1572 French St. Bartholomew's Day Massacre, which prompted the Polish-Lithuanian nobility to ensure that no monarch would ever be able to carry out such an act in Poland.

The people most involved in preparing the articles were Mikołaj Sienicki (leader of the "execution movement"), Jan Firlej, and Jan Zborowski. Together with his brothers, Jan Zborowski became the head of the Zborowskis party. Their efforts were opposed by many dignitaries of the Roman Catholic Church. Franciszek Krasiński was the only lone bishop who signed them (Szymon Starowolski claimed he did so under the "threat of the sword"), and the future legal acts containing the Articles of the Confederation were signed by Catholic bishops with the stipulation: "excepto articulo confoederationis" (except the article of the confederation). Another Catholic bishop, Wawrzyniec Goślicki, was excommunicated by the Holy See for acceding to the repeated acts of the Sejm of 1587.

In 1573, Zborowski participated in the Polish address to Paris, which aimed to bring Henry of Valois to the Polish-Lithuanian Commonwealth. During the meeting of the envoy with the king-elect in the cathedral of Notre-Dame, he forced the Duke of Anjou, speaking loudly in his direction in the lingua franca of Classical Latin: "Si non iurabis, non regnabis" ("If you do not swear, you will not reign"). With these words, he addressed the future king of Poland and the Grand Duke of Lithuania, Henry of Valois, who did not want to guarantee the Commonwealth freedom of faith, conscience, and word. This provision was part of the Articles of 1573, ensuring the Polish and Lithuanian nobility these freedoms.

The legitimisation of the principles of tolerance was a significant achievement. The Articles of the Warsaw Confederation were the foundational document for the election, incorporated into the statutes that every newly elected king had to swear to uphold (the "Henrician Articles"), thus becoming constitutional provisions alongside the Pacta conventa, also instituted in 1573. Despite some generalities, the Warsaw Confederation provided a legal foundation for Polish Protestantism and was the first act of broad religious tolerance in Europe.

=== Election and impact on Poland's religious and political landscape ===
The election of a new king in Poland was closely monitored by the Holy See in Rome with considerable interest and concern. This event held significant importance due to the ongoing threat of war with the Ottoman Empire and the further re-Catholicisation of Poland and other European states. Pope Gregory XIII, informed by Cardinal Hosius about the situation in Poland, ordered public prayers for the successful election of the Polish king and dispatched one of the best papal diplomats, Cardinal Giovanni Francesco Commendone, to Poland–Lithuania.

Among the candidates for the Polish–Lithuanian throne were Protestants (Duke Albert of Prussia, King John III of Sweden), the Orthodox Tsar Ivan the Terrible, and Catholics (Archduke Ernest of Habsburg, Prince Henry of Valois from France). Henry of Valois was proposed as a candidate for the throne of the Commonwealth by Jean de Monluc, Bishop of Valence. Monluc assured the electors that Henry would marry Anna Jagiellon, the heiress of the Jagiellons and sister of King Sigismund II Augustus, to uphold the dynastic tradition. His candidature was also supported by Anna Jagiellon herself. Due to the potential war with the Ottoman Empire and the support of Catholic interests, the Pope instructed Cardinal Commendone to support the Habsburg candidacy, which he also communicated in a letter to the Polish bishops. This candidacy was opposed by both Protestants and the noble masses, who feared the loss of their Golden Liberty and war with the Ottoman Empire. It was said: "What happens to others, that is to the Hungarians, Silesians, Bohemians, would happen to the Poles [...] Poles would no longer expect an election, as they [Habsburgs] would make us their heirs."

At the electoral Sejm in April 1573, two candidacies were proposed: Archduke Ernest of Habsburg and Prince Henry of Valois from France. On 11 May 1573, primate Uchański announced the nomination of King Henry of Valois, which the Protestants agreed to after some negotiations. The pacta conventa, which the new king had to swear to, included the provisions of the Warsaw Confederation at the request of the dissenters. The election of Prince Henry as King of Poland was received with joy in Rome, although it was unofficially said that the Ottoman Sultan Selim II contributed to this. On 11 May 1573, a prayer of thanksgiving was held in Rome, celebrated by Cardinal Hosius in the presence of Pope Gregory XIII and 31 cardinals.

In February 1574, the young 22-year-old King Henry arrived in Poland, and in June, when news of the death of his brother King Charles IX of France reached Kraków, he escaped from Poland forever to return to France and claim the French throne. There were calls for his immediate dethronement. His departure left the throne of Poland vacant, leading to significant political turmoil and the need for a new election. After the king's abrupt departure, signs of chaos were not lacking. In Kraków, on 12 October 1574, a crowd demolished the Calvinist church known as the brog, and the Sejm in Środa demanded the expulsion of the Jesuits from Poznań as agitators against the nobility.

The ten-year reign of King Stephen Báthory of Transylvania (1576–1586), along with his elected co-ruler and wife, Queen Anna Jagiellon of Poland, was of decisive importance for the religious future of Poland. The rebellious city of Gdańsk, unwilling to recognise him as King of Poland, not only submitted and paid a contribution but also had to rebuild the Cistercian abbey in Oliwa, which had been destroyed by a mob. Thanks to King Stephen's initiative, the Polish Church adopted the Tridentine decrees at the Piotrków Synod (1577). In accordance with the wishes of Pope Gregory XIII, King Stephen significantly supported the Jesuits, who expanded their ecclesiastical activities during his reign. This included the Diocese of Wenden, endowed by the king, and the newly opened Vilnius Academy, entrusted to the Jesuits (1579). Even in his will, he admonished his nephew, Prince Sigismund Báthory, to defend the Catholic religion and the Jesuits against the Protestantised Hungarian estates.

After the victorious Livonian campaign of Stephen Báthory against the Tsardom of Moscow, when a ten-year truce was concluded in the Truce of Yam-Zapolsky in 1582 through the mediation of Jesuit Antonio Possevino, King Stephen, with the cooperation of Pope Sixtus V, organised an anti-Ottoman league, which was to include the kingdoms of Spain, Germany, Poland–Lithuania, Republic of Venice, and the Tsardom of Moscow. The league was also supported by the nobility. The death of the king on 12 December 1586 hindered the realisation of the league's plans. Sixtus V, speaking at a public consistory on 7 January 1587, tearfully remarked on the king's death: "We had placed great hopes in him, we had already sent him financial aid for a certain undertaking [...], we consider his unexpected death as a punishment for our sins. In misfortune, however, we do not lose our heads, for we have the assurance that Christ will not abandon us." Although the king was a devout Catholic, he upheld religious tolerance. He did not allow anti-Protestant actions, adhered to the Warsaw Confederation, and upon hearing of actions against dissenters in Kraków, issued an ordinance against the perpetrators of the riots. In 1581, he sent a mandate to Vilnius, noting that he had sworn to uphold the confederation and wished to maintain it, "leaving each person's conscience in matters of faith to the judgment of God."

=== Decline ===
Warsaw Confederation did not include means to enforce its articles and while taking some effect, it couldn't surpass Polish custom law which required consent from both secular and ecclesiastical estates. Catholic bishops had not given their consent and moreover started to challenge it making appeals to the king. With the rise of Counter-Reformation, non-Catholic religious groups gradually went back to being oppressed. Provisions of the Warsaw Confederation were also only binding to nobleman, which meant they did not apply to peasants and residents of the cities. And while that was not the issue in Orthodox-dominated cities, in Catholic-controlled cities it led to further restrictions of non-Catholics. For example in 1572 Orthodox Ruthenians in Lviv were granted the same rights with Polish Catholics, but king's decree was ignored by Catholic-controlled city council claiming that it had contravened the city's rights and privileges. The situation remained unchanged even after local Ruthenians had converted to Greek Catholicism.

By the 1590s, there were anti-Jewish outbreaks in Poznań, Lublin, Kraków, Vilnius and Kyiv. And in 1596 after Union of Brest, Orthodox church was outlawed by the Crown.

== Significance ==
Late-16th-century Poland–Lithuania stood between the Orthodox Tsardom of Moscow in the East, the Muslim Ottoman Empire to the South, and Western Europe, torn between Protestant Reformation and Counter-Reformation, to the North and West. Its religious tolerance made it a welcome refuge for those escaping religious persecution elsewhere; in the words of Cardinal Hosius, it became "a place of shelter for heretics". The confederation legalised the previously unwritten customs of religious tolerance.

The debate over whether religious freedom in historical contexts was intended solely for the nobility or also for burghers and peasants is a topic of discussion among historians. While there are differing opinions, many historians lean towards the interpretation that religious freedom was intended for all social classes, not just the nobility.

The Warsaw Confederation of 1573 was a groundbreaking document that established religious tolerance in the Polish-Lithuanian Commonwealth. As historian Norman Davies noted, "Certainly, the wording and substance of the declaration of the Confederation of Warsaw of 28 January 1573 were extraordinary with regards to prevailing conditions elsewhere in Europe; and they governed the principles of religious life in the Commonwealth for over two hundred years." This confederation was a significant achievement, ensuring that the principles of religious tolerance were upheld for generations.

In 2003, the text of the Warsaw Confederation was added to UNESCO's Memory of the World Programme.

== Parchment wax seals ==
Among the 209 suspended seal bowls on the parchment manuscript, as determined during the latest conservation work by Justyna Król-Próba from the Central Archives of Historical Records in Warsaw, there are 181 wax seals with the heraldic imprints of the signatories, 27 empty bowls (without imprints), and one fragment. These wax seals, belonging to each member of the legislature, hang in seven horizontal rows, with each row intended to hold 32 seals across 16 vertical string cords. This suggests, according to the researcher's assumptions, that at the time of the manuscript's creation, it could have had 224 suspended seals.

== English translation ==
An English translation from the original Warsaw Confederation articles, with Latin phrases retained, provided by contemporary historians Tristan Korecki and Philip Earl Steele, is available online at the Polish History Museum in Warsaw.

== See also ==
- Edict of Torda
- Edict of Nantes
- Letter of Majesty
- Statute of Kalisz
- Warsaw Confederation (1704)
