= 1648 Polish–Lithuanian royal election =

Royal election in the Polish–Lithuanian Commonwealth

1648 Polish–Lithuanian Free election
- October 6, 1648 – November 17, 1648
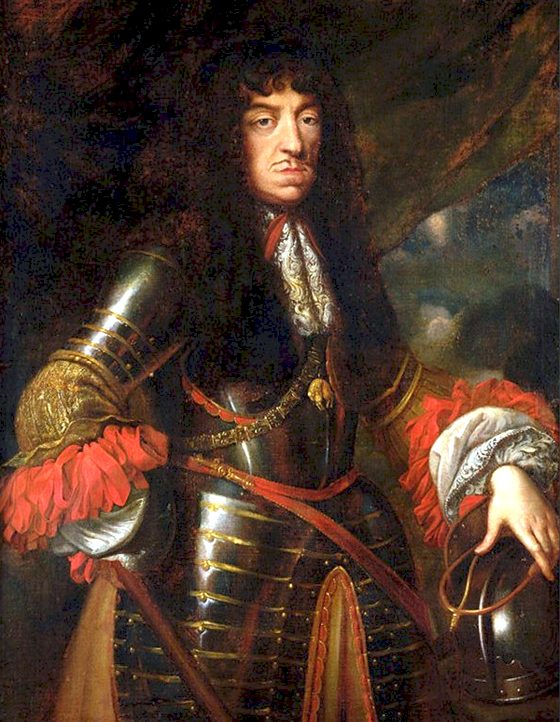

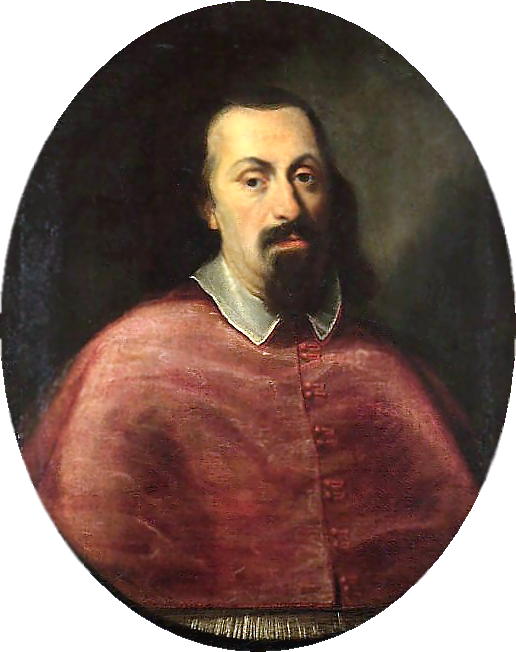
Candidate	John Casimir Vasa	Charles Ferdinand Vasa
Faction	Pro-peace	Pro-war
Result	Elected	Defeated
King before election
Władysław IV
Elected King
John II Casimir Vasa

The 1648 free election in the Polish–Lithuanian Commonwealth began on 6 October 1648, and ended on November 17 of the same year. The new King of Poland and Grand Duke of Lithuania was John II Casimir, the younger brother of previous king, Władysław IV, who had died on May 20, 1648.

== Background ==
The death of King Władysław IV, which took place in the town of Merecz (now Merkine), was not a surprise, as the king, despite being only 52 years of age, suffered from gout and kidney failure. Władysław died at the beginning of the Khmelnytsky Uprising, which devastated southeastern part of the enormous country. Following the customary rule, Poland–Lithuania the Primate, Maciej Łubieński, became interrex. Due to Łubieński’s health problems, the powerful Crown Chancellor, Jerzy Ossoliński, ruled in his stead.

The 1648 free election was, to a large degree, influenced by the ongoing conflict in the Ukrainian provinces of Poland. The two opposing factions that emerged during the election were:

- the pro-peace camp, headed by Jerzy Ossolinski and the Starosta of Kiev Adam Kisiel. It supported the election of John Casimir,
- the pro-war camp, headed by Jeremi Wiśniowiecki and Aleksander Koniecpolski. This camp backed John Casimir's brother, the Prince-Bishop of Breslau, Charles Ferdinand.

Apart from the two House of Vasa candidates, the Protestant nobility supported Sigismund Rakoczi, son of Duke of Transilvania, George I Rakoczi. Sigismund was also backed by Orthodox Christians, and by Bohdan Khmelnytsky.

== Convocation Sejm ==
The so-called Convocation Sejm convened in Warsaw on July 16, 1648, and deliberated until August 1. The two camps argued with each other, as the pro-war faction blamed late King Władysław and Jerzy Ossoliński for the outbreak of the uprising in the Polish Ukraine. Upon the request of Ossolinski, the Sejm became a confederation, in order to begin negotiations with Khmelnytsky, and to break down the Zaporizhian Cossack - Crimean Tatar alliance.

== Election ==
The election, which began on October 6, 1648, took place in the shadow of a disastrous Polish defeat in the Battle of Pilawce, in which Polish forces were commanded by Władysław Dominik Zasławski, Mikołaj Ostroróg and Aleksander Koniecpolski. All three supported the Prince-Bishop of Breslau Charles Ferdinand, but despite this, the outcome of the election was uncertain.

Since both candidates enjoyed widespread support among the electors, there was a danger that a double election would take place, similar to the one in 1587. The situation did not change after Queen Marie Louise Gonzaga expressed her support of John Casimir. Furthermore, John Casimir was backed by the Kingdom of France, the Swedish Empire and Brandenburg-Prussia.

The stalemate ended when Sigismund Rakoczi backed out of the election, after the death of his father (on October 11). Hetman Janusz Radziwiłł, who had supported Rakoczi, then decided to back John Casimir. Also, Bohdan Khmelnytsky, himself a Polish subject, who at the same time commanded the siege of Zamość Fortress, sent a letter to Warsaw, expressing his support of John. Khmelnytsky’s letter was welcomed by the electors, who hoped for a truce with the Cossacks.

Since Charles was well aware that his election would mean war, and that the situation in the Commonwealth was difficult, he decided to withdraw his nomination (November 11, 1648). In exchange, he received the Duchy of Opole and Racibórz and two abbeys.

On November 17, John Casimir Vasa was elected as the new King of Poland and Grand Duke of Lithuania. Three days later, he signed the pacta conventa, and Primate Łubieński confirmed the nomination. The coronation took place in Kraków’s Wawel Cathedral, on January 17, 1649.

== Sources ==
- S. Grzybowski, Dzieje Polski i Litwy (1506–1648), pod red. S. Grodziskiego, w: Wielka Historia Polski, Kraków 2003
- U. Augustyniak, Historia Polski 1572–1795, Warszawa 2008
- Z. Wójcik, Wiek XVI-XVII, Warszawa 1991
- M. Markiewicz, Historia Polski 1494–1795, Kraków 2002
