= Election sejm =

Election sejm (Polish: Sejm elekcyjny; Lithuanian: Elekcinis seimas) was one of three kinds of special general sejm in pre-partition Polish–Lithuanian Commonwealth. Upon vacancy of the throne, the election sejm, meeting at Wola outside Warsaw, elected a new king.

Any hereditary nobleman could vote in the Election Parliament, if present. Often close to 100,000 nobles came to those sejms.

The other two kinds of special sejm—likewise concerned with the filling of the throne—were the "convocation sejm" and the "coronation sejm."

== See also ==
- Royal elections in Poland
