= Royal elections in Poland =

Elections of individual kings in Poland

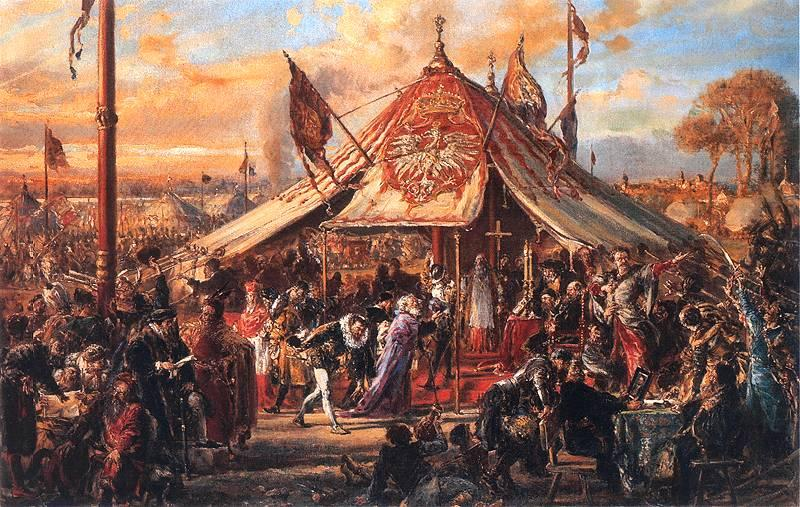
The first Polish royal election, of Henry III of France in 1573 (1889 Painting by Jan Matejko)

Royal elections in Poland (Polish: wolna elekcja, lit. 'free election') were the election of individual monarchs, rather than dynasties, to the Polish throne. Based on legendary traditions dating to the beginning of the Polish statehood, they became the official procedure in choosing a monarch, following the death of the last hereditary monarch, Queen Jadwiga Anjou, in 1399. The electoral system was in use throughout the entire Jagiellonian dynasty and reached its final form in the Polish–Lithuanian Commonwealth period between 1572 and 1791.

The royal election system was briefly abolished by the Constitution of 3 May 1791 (which established a constitutional-parliamentary hereditary monarchy) before being revoked in 1793.

== Evolution ==
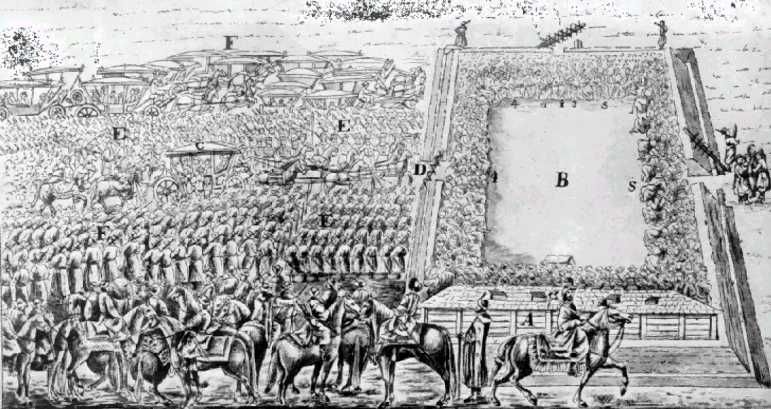
The election of Michał Korybut Wiśniowiecki (Michael I) as king of Poland at Wola outside Warsaw (1669)

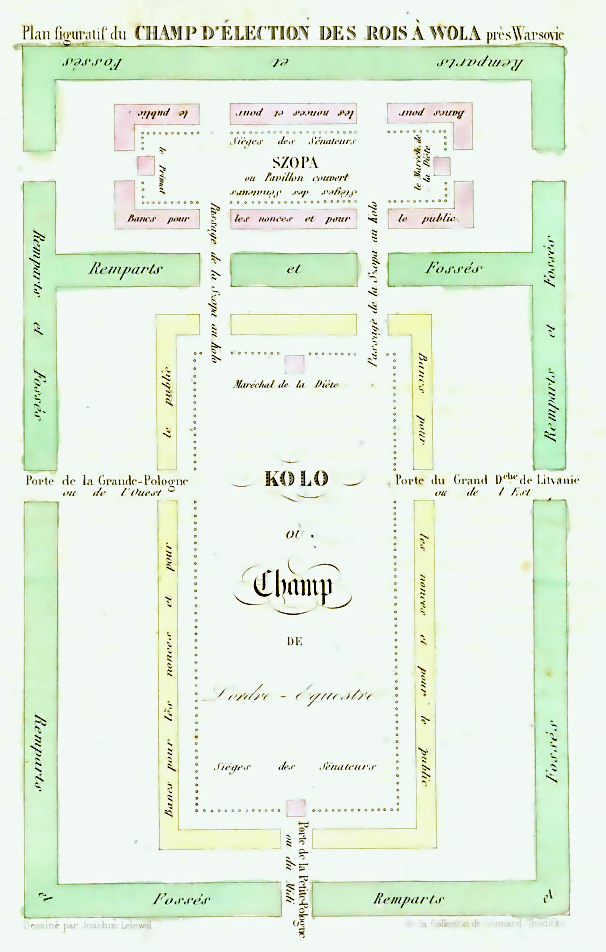
Plan of the elective camp of Polish kings in Wola near Warsaw

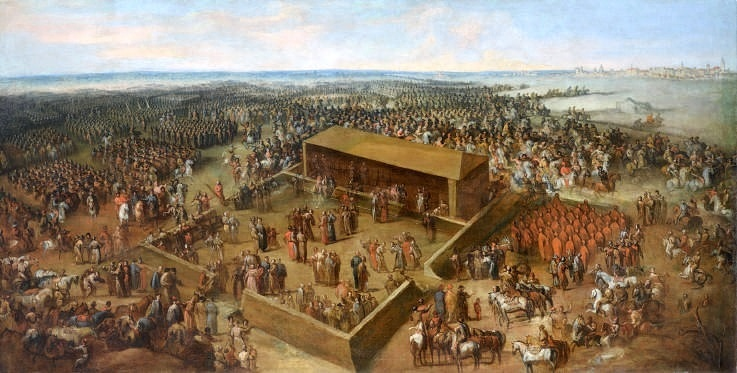
Election of August II the Strong at Wola, outside Warsaw (1697). Painting by Jean-Pierre Norblin de La Gourdaine.

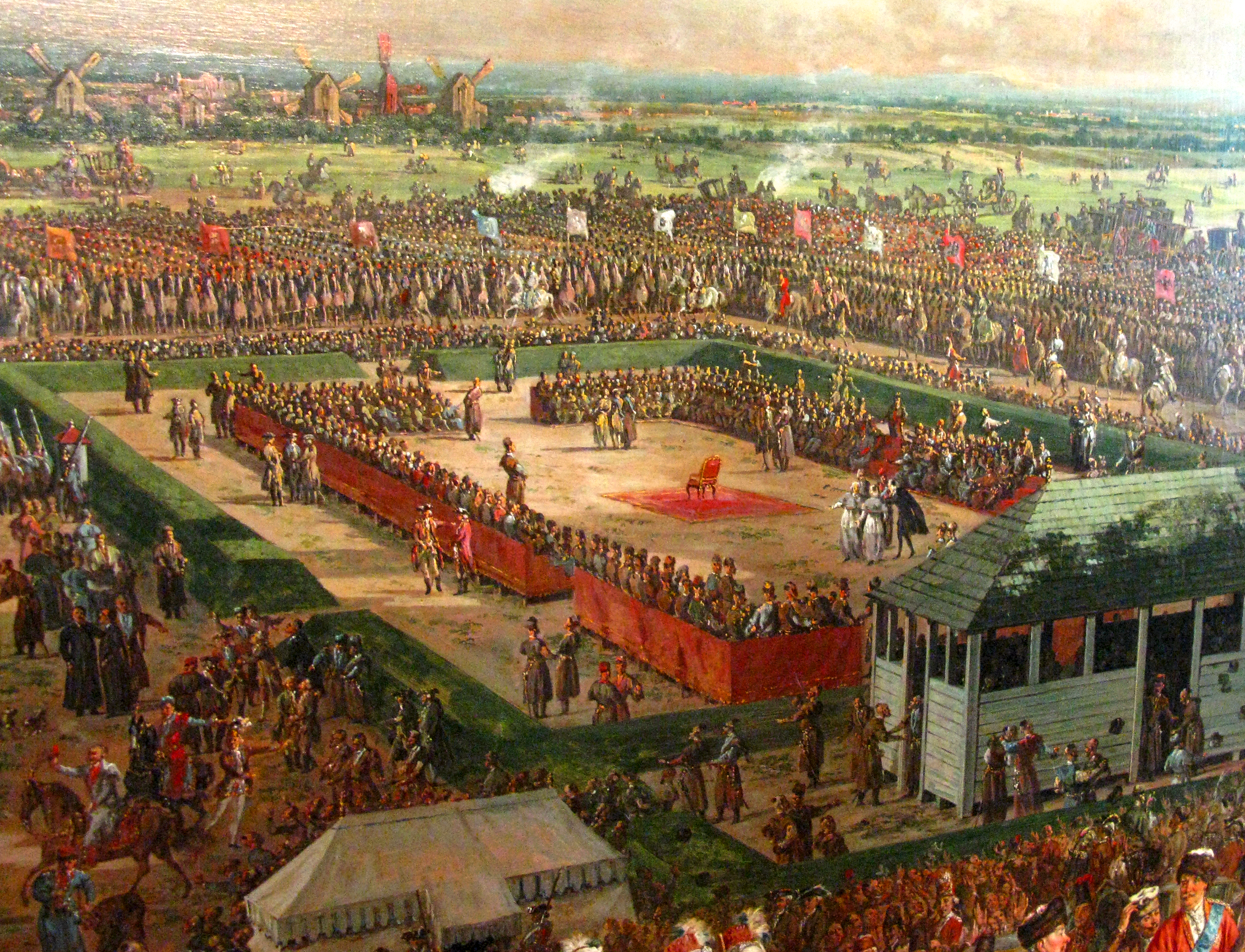
Election of Stanisław August Poniatowski (Stanisław II Augustus) in 1764

The tradition of electing the country's ruler, which occurred either when there was no clear heir to the throne, or to confirm an heir's appointment, dates to the beginning of Polish statehood. Legends survive of the 9th century "election" of the traditional founder of the first Polish royal family, Piast the Wheelwright of the Piast dynasty, and the subsequent choosing of his son, Siemowit, although such elections may have been little more than a formality. The election privilege, exercised during the gatherings known as wiec, was usually limited to the most powerful nobles, (magnates) and officials, and was heavily influenced by local traditions and strength of the ruler.

Traditions diverged in different regions of the country during the period of the fragmentation of Poland. In the Duchy of Masovia, the hereditary principle dominated, but in the Seniorate Province, elections became increasingly important. In other provinces both systems were used. By the 12th or 13th century, the wiec institution limited participation to high-ranking nobles and officials. The nationwide gatherings of officials in 1306 and 1310 can be seen as a precursor of the Polish parliament (general sejm).

The elections reinforced the power of the nobility electorate, as the contender to the throne would increasingly consider issuing promises he would fulfil in the event of a successful election. Wenceslaus II of Bohemia made the first such undertaking (the Litomyšl Privilege) in 1291. Nevertheless, for most of the Piast dynasty, electors customarily endorsed rulers from that dynasty, in accordance with hereditary descent. The Piast dynasty came to an end in 1370 with the heirless death of the last of the Polish Piasts of the main line, Casimir III the Great.

In a milestone for the process of the free elections, Casimir's nephew, Louis I of Hungary, became king after the agreement between him, Casimir III the Great and the Polish nobility (Privilege of Buda). Louis had no sons, which created another dilemma for the succession of the Polish throne. In an attempt to secure the throne of Poland for his line, he gathered the nobles and sought their approval to have one of his daughters appointed queen regnant of Poland in exchange for the Privilege of Koszyce (1374).

=== End of hereditary rule ===
Louis's youngest daughter, Jadwiga, ascended the throne of Poland in 1384 and was viewed as hereditary monarch – the "naturally-enthroned" and "inherent" Lady of the Kingdom (Polish: "pani naturalna/pani przyrodzona królestwa") – being an heir to both Anjou and Piast dynasties on the virtue of being daughter of the previous king. While her ascendancy needed to be approved by nobles because of lack of precedence for the female succession in Poland, she was then viewed as the unquestioned bearer of the hereditary rights to the Polish throne, with any legitimate children born to her inheriting that position. Polish nobles subsequently chose Jagiełło, Grand Duke of Lithuania to be her husband and co-regent. Jadwiga and her only daughter and heiress, Princess Elizabeth, both died in 1399, ending the hereditary monarchy in Poland and leaving the future succession (after Jagiełło's eventual death) ambiguous.

=== Succession during the Jagiellonian dynasty ===
After Jadwiga and Elizabeth's deaths, Polish nobles continued to recognize Jagiełło as their king, but, as he was a ruler by election, any children from his future marriages did not automatically have the right to assume the throne. He would need to issue more privileges to the nobility to secure the guarantee that, upon his death, one of his sons would succeed him.

During an election, the royal council chose the candidates, and the delegates of nobility and towns confirmed them during the sejm. This method continued in effect throughout the nearly two centuries of the Jagiellon Dynasty, although in reality it was a mere confirmation of an incoming heir.

The monarchy of Poland at that time could be described as a "hereditary monarchy with an elective legislature". A major reason was the desire on the part of Polish nobility to retain the Polish–Lithuanian union, and the Jagiellon dynasty was the hereditary ruler of the Grand Duchy of Lithuania. Nonetheless, the pretense of having a choice by election remained important for the nobility, and when, in 1529, Sigismund I the Old attempted to secure the hereditary throne for his nine-year-old son, the nobles acknowledged the young prince as his father's co-ruler but the event caused subsequent unrest.

In 1572, Poland's Jagiellon dynasty became extinct upon the death, without a successor, of Sigismund II Augustus. During the ensuing interregnum, anxiety for the stability of the Commonwealth led to agreements among the political classes that, pending the election of a new king, the Roman Catholic Primate of Poland would exercise supreme authority, acting as interrex; and that special "hooded" confederations (Polish: konfederacje kapturowe, named after the hoods traditionally worn by their members) of nobles would assume power in each the country's regions. The Poles decided that they would choose the next king by election, and they established the terms of such an election at a convocation sejm (sejm konwokacyjny) in 1573. On the initiative of nobles from southern Poland, supported by the future Great Crown Chancellor and hetman Jan Zamoyski, every male noble (szlachta) who assembled for the purpose would become an elector. Supposedly, any catholic nobleman could stand for election; but in practice only rich and powerful members of foreign dynasties or commonwealth magnates had a serious chance for consideration. With the election of the first king of the "free election" period, the electoral system assumed its final form, which remained stable for the next two centuries. This process was solidified in the Henrician Articles, passed by the first elected king, Henry of Valois.

Particularly in the late 17th and 18th centuries, the political instability from the elections led numerous political writers to suggest major changes to the system: most notably, to restrict the elections to Polish candidates only (that became known as the "election of a Piast"). Many kings were from foreign nations, meaning the Polish election became a multi-national struggle. The elections often saw the Polish nobility attempt to elect a weak and controllable monarch, and there were large amounts of corruption, particularly related to bribes. None of the projects at reforming the electoral method came into force, however. The Constitution of 3 May 1791 eliminated the practice of electing individuals to the monarchy, but it was revoked in 1793.

== Procedure ==
Three special sejms handled the process of the royal election in the interregnum period:

Convocation sejm (sejm konwokacyjny)
This was called upon a death or abdication of a king by the primate of Poland. Deputies would focus on establishing the dates and any special rules for the election (in particular, preparation of pacta conventa, bills of privileges to be sworn by the king) and on screening the candidates. It was scheduled to last two weeks.
Election sejm (sejm elekcyjny)
The nobility voted for a candidate for the throne. It was open to all members of the nobility and so often had many more attendees than a regular sejm. The exact numbers of attendees were never recorded and are estimated to vary from 10,000 to over 100,000; the usual numbers tended to be towards the lower end of the scale, around 10,000–15,000. The voting could take several days (in 1573, it was recorded that it took four days). The entire sejm was planned to last six weeks. To handle the increased numbers, it would be held in Wola, then a village near Warsaw. Royal candidates themselves would be barred from attending the sejm but were allowed to send representatives. Although attending nobles could have discussed their preferences at local sejmiks sessions before attending the election sejm, matters were often a heated debate that could last days and lead to fights and battles. "In 1764, when only thirteen electors were killed, it was said that the Election was unusually quiet."
Coronation sejm (sejm koronacyjny)
This was held in Kraków. The coronation ceremony was traditionally held by the primate, who relinquished his powers to the chosen king. It was planned to last two weeks. The king-elect undertook various ceremonies and formalities, such as swearing an oath to uphold the pacta conventa and the Henrician Articles. The coronation itself usually took place in Wawel Cathedral; although the coronations of Stanisław I Leszczyński and Stanisław August Poniatowski (Stanisław II Augustus) took place in Warsaw.

== Influence ==
The elections played a major role in curtailing the power of the monarch. They were a significant factor in preventing the rise of an absolute monarchy, with a strong executive, in the Commonwealth. One of the provisions of the pacta conventa included the right of revolution (Polish: rokosz) for the nobility if it considered the king not to be adhering to the laws of the state.

While seemingly introducing a democratic procedure, free elections, in practice, contributed to the inefficiency of the Commonwealth's government. The elections, open to all nobility, meant that magnates, who could significantly control the masses of poorer nobility, could exert much influence over the elections.

The elections also encouraged foreign dynasties' meddling in Polish internal politics. On several occasions, if the magnates could not come to an agreement, two candidates proclaimed themselves king and civil wars erupted (most notably, the Wars of the Polish Succession in 1733–1738 and 1587–1588, with smaller scale conflicts in 1576 and 1697). By the last years of the Commonwealth, royal elections grew to be seen as a source of conflicts and instability, and "a symbol of anarchy".

== List of elections ==
=== Crown of the Kingdom of Poland ===
After the death of Queen Jadwiga Anjou, her widower Władysław II Jagiełło remained on the Polish throne, but his descendants did not possess hereditary right to the throne. The nobility eventually agreed to recognize his descendants as heirs to the crown, while denying them any specific way of inheritance like primogeniture or seniority, and opting instead for the succession on the basis of election within the dynasty.

Election	Coronation	Elected king (reign)	Notes	Other candidates
2 February 1386	4 March 1386	Władysław II Jagiełło (1386–1434)	Elected to be king by marriage as husband of Queen Jadwiga of Poland, who was a hereditary ruler. Remained on the Polish throne after Jadwiga had died without surviving children.	William of Austria; Siemowit IV, Duke of Masovia; Vladislaus II of Opole
25 July 1434		Władysław III (1434–1444)	Eldest living child of Jagiełło. Disappeared during the Crusade of Varna.	Casimir Andrew Jagiellon; Siemowit V of Masovia
23 April 1445	25 June 1447	Casimir IV (1447–1492)	The only known living child of Jagiełło after the disappearance of his brother.	Bolesław IV of Warsaw; Frederick II of Brandenburg
27 August 1492	23 September 1492	John I Albert (1492–1501)	Son of previous king.	Vladislaus Jagiellon; Sigismund Jagiellon; Janusz II of Płock
3 October 1501	12 December 1501	Alexander (1501–1506)	Brother of previous king.	Vladislaus Jagiellon; Sigismund Jagiellon
8 December 1506	24 January 1507	Sigismund I the Old (1506–1548)	Brother of previous king.	Vladislaus Jagiellon
18 December 1529	20 February 1530	Sigismund II Augustus (1529–1572)	Son of Sigismund I, declared his father's co-ruler during vivente rege election. Became sole ruler in 1548. The last male member of the Jagiellonian dynasty.	None

=== Polish-Lithuanian Commonwealth ===
In the period of the Polish–Lithuanian Commonwealth, 10 elections (composed of the convocation, election and coronation sejmik) were held in Poland, resulting in the elevation of 11 kings.

Convocation Sejm	Election Sejm	Coronation Sejm	Elected ruler (nationality, reign)	Notes	Other candidates
January 1573	April 1573	February 1574	Henry, Duke of Anjou; Henry (French, 1573–1574)	First king of the Commonwealth. Dethroned after he had left Poland to assume the throne of France.	Archduke Ernest of Austria; John III of Sweden; Ivan IV of Russia; Feodor of Russia; Alfonso II of Ferrara; William of Rosenberg; Jerzy Jazłowiecki; Jan Kostka; Wawrzyniec Słupski
August 1574	November 1575	March 1576	Stephen Báthory (Hungarian, 1575–1586) and Anna Jagiellon (Lithuanian, 1575–1586)	Princess of Poland-Lithuania and Prince of Transylvania. Married to each other. Election disputed, led to the Danzig rebellion.	Maximilian II, Holy Roman Emperor; Archduke Ernest of Austria; Ferdinand II, Archduke of Austria; John III of Sweden; Ivan IV of Russia; Feodor of Russia; Alfonso II of Ferrara; Andrzej Tęczyński; William of Rosenberg
February 1587	June 1587	December 1588	Sigmund, Duke of Finland; Sigismund III Vasa (1587–1632)	Born in Sweden. Son of Catherine Jagiellon. Election disputed, led to the War of the Polish Succession (1587–88).	Archduke Maximilian of Austria; Feodor I of Russia; Ferdinand II, Archduke of Austria; Archduke Matthias of Austria; Archduke Ernest of Austria
June 1632	September 1632	February 1633	Prince Ladislaus of Sweden; Władysław IV Vasa (1632–1648)	Son of Sigismund III.	Gustavus Adolphus of Sweden
July 1648	October 1648	January 1649	Prince John Casimir of Sweden; John II Casimir (1648–1668)	Son of Sigismund III and brother of Władysław IV. Abdicated.	Zsigmond Rákóczi; Karol Ferdynand Vasa
November 1668	May 1669	October 1669	Michał Korybut Wiśniowiecki; Michael I (1669–1673)		Louis, Prince of Condé; Henri Jules, Duke of Bourbon; Philip William, Count Palatine of Neuburg; Charles of Lorraine; Alexis of Russia; Tsarevich Alexei Alexeyevich of Russia; Feodor Alexeyevich of Russia; Christina of Sweden; Frederick William, Elector of Brandenburg; Adil Giray; James, Duke of York; Dymitr Jerzy Wiśniowiecki; Aleksander Janusz Zasławski; Aleksander Polanowski
January 1674	April 1674	February 1676	John Sobieski; John III Sobieski (1674–1696)		Louis, Prince of Condé; Philip William, Count Palatine of Neuburg; Charles of Lorraine; Prince George of Denmark; Louis Thomas, Count of Soissons; Mihály Apafi
August 1696	May 1697	November 1697	Frederick Augustus I, Elector of Saxony; Augustus II (Saxon, 1697–1706; 1709–1733)	Temporarily replaced by Stanisław I Leszczyński (1704–1709) due to the Great Northern War. Leszczyński's election was disputed and led to the Civil war in Poland (1704–1706).	François Louis, Prince of Conti; Charles Philip of Palatinate-Neuburg; Leopold, Duke of Lorraine; Louis William, Margrave of Baden-Baden; James Louis Sobieski, Prince of Oława; Maximilian II Emanuel, Elector of Bavaria; Livio Odescalchi, Duke of Bracciano
April 1733	August 1733	January 1734	Stanisław Leszczyński; Stanisław I Leszczyński (1733–1736)	Election disputed, led to the War of the Polish Succession, won by Augustus III of Poland (Saxon, 1733–1763), son of Augustus II.	Infante Manuel, Count of Ourém
May 1764	August 1764	December 1764	Stanisław August Poniatowski; Stanisław II Augustus (1764–1795)	Last king of the Commonwealth. Abdicated.	Frederick Christian, Elector of Saxony; Adam Kazimierz Czartoryski; Michał Kazimierz Ogiński; Jan Klemens Branicki

== See also ==
- Golden Liberty
- Elections in Poland
- 1573 Polish–Lithuanian royal election
- Electio Viritim Monument in Warsaw
