= Golden Liberty =

Former political system in Poland and Poland-Lithuania

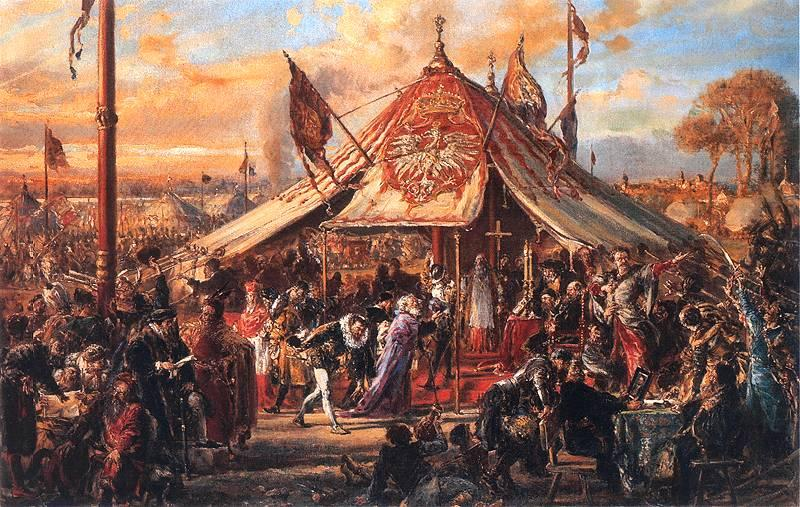
The Republic at the Zenith of Its Power. Golden Liberty. The Royal Election of 1573, by Jan Matejko

Golden Liberty (Latin: Aurea Libertas; Polish: Złota Wolność [ˈzwɔ.ta ˈvɔl.nɔɕt͡ɕ], Lithuanian: Auksinė laisvė), sometimes referred to as Golden Freedoms, Nobles' Democracy or Nobles' Commonwealth (Polish: Rzeczpospolita Szlachecka or Złota wolność szlachecka) was a political system in the Kingdom of Poland and, after the Union of Lublin (1569), in the Polish–Lithuanian Commonwealth. Under that system, all nobles (szlachta), regardless of rank, economic status or their ethnic background were considered to have equal legal status and enjoyed extensive legal rights and privileges. The nobility controlled the legislature (the Sejm—the parliament) and the Commonwealth's elected king.

== Development ==
This political system, unique in Europe, stemmed from the consolidation of power by the szlachta (noble class) over other social classes and over the monarchical political system. In time, the szlachta accumulated enough privileges (established by the Nihil novi Act (1505), King Henry's Articles (1573), and various Pacta conventa, lit. "agreed terms/treaties") that no monarch could hope to break the szlachta's grip on power.

The political doctrine of the Commonwealth of the Two Nations was "our state is a republic under the presidency of the King". Chancellor Jan Zamoyski summed up this doctrine when he said that "Rex regnat sed non gubernat" ("The King reigns and does not govern"). The Commonwealth had a parliament, the Sejm, as well as a Senat and an elected king. The king was obliged to respect szlachta rights specified in King Henry's Articles as well as in pacta conventa negotiated at the time of his election.

The monarch's power was limited, in favour of the sizable noble class. Each new king had to subscribe to King Henry's Articles, which were the basis of Poland's political system and included almost unprecedented guarantees of religious tolerance. Over time, King Henry's Articles were merged with the pacta conventa, specific pledges agreed to by the king-elect. From then on, the king was effectively a partner with the noble class and was always supervised by a group of senators. The doctrine had ancient republican thought at its roots, which was then reapplied with varying success to an elective monarchy's political reality.

The foundation of the Commonwealth's political system, the "Golden Liberty" (Polish: Złota Wolność, a term used from 1573), included the following:

- the election of the king by all nobles wishing to participate, known as wolna elekcja (free election)
- Sejm, the Commonwealth parliament, which the king was required to hold every two years
- pacta conventa (Latin), "agreed-to agreements" negotiated with the king-elect, including a bill of rights, binding on the king, derived from the earlier King Henry's Articles
- rokosz (insurrection), the right of szlachta to form a legal rebellion against a king who violated their guaranteed freedoms
- religious freedom guaranteed by Warsaw Confederation Act 1573
- liberum veto (Latin), the right of an individual land envoy to oppose a decision by the majority in a Sejm session; the voicing of such a "free veto" nullified all the legislation that had been passed at that session; during the crisis of the second half of the 17th century, Polish nobles could also use the liberum veto in provincial sejmiks
- konfederacja (from the Latin confederatio), the right to form an organization to force through a common political aim

The Commonwealth's political system is difficult to fit into a simple category, but it can be tentatively described as a mixture of these:

- confederation and federation, with regard to the broad autonomy of its regions. It is, however, difficult to decisively call the Commonwealth either confederation or federation, as it had some qualities of both of them
- oligarchy, as only the male szlachta, around 15% of the population, had political rights
- democracy, as all of the szlachta were equal in rights and privileges, and the Sejm could veto the king on important matters, including legislation (the adoption of new laws), foreign affairs, declaration of war and taxation (changes of existing taxes or the levying of new ones). Also, the 10% of Commonwealth population who enjoyed those political rights (the szlachta) were a substantially larger percentage than in any other European country, and the nobles extended from powerful princes to knights poorer than many peasants; in comparison, in France, only about 1% of the population had the right to vote in 1831, and in 1832, in the United Kingdom, only about 14% of male adults could vote
- elective monarchy, as the monarch, elected by the szlachta, was the head of state
- constitutional monarchy, as the monarch was bound by pacta conventa and other laws, and the szlachta could disobey any of the king's decrees that they deemed to be illegal

== Assessment ==
The "Golden Liberty" was a unique and controversial feature of Poland's political system. It was an exception, characterized by a strong aristocracy and a feeble king, in an age when absolutism was developing in the stronger countries of Europe, but the exception was characterized by a striking similarity to certain modern values. At a time that most European countries were headed toward centralization, absolute monarchy and religious and dynastic warfare, the Commonwealth experimented with decentralization, confederation and federation, democracy, religious tolerance. The system was a precursor of the modern concepts of broader democracy and constitutional monarchy as well as federation. The szlachta citizens of the Commonwealth praised the right of resistance, the social contract, the liberty of the individual, the principle of government by consent, the value of self-reliance, all widespread concepts found in the modern, liberal democracies. Just like liberal democrats of the 19th and 20th centuries, the Polish noblemen were concerned about the power of the state. The Polish noblemen were strongly opposed to the very concept of the authoritarian state.

Perhaps the closest parallels to Poland's 'Noble Democracy' can be found outside Europe altogether, in America, among the slave-owning aristocracy of Southern United States, where slave-owning democrats and founding fathers of the US, such as Thomas Jefferson or George Washington, had many values in common with the reformist noblemen of the Commonwealth. However, the comparison is very weak, as the so-called Southern aristocracy was not limited to a hereditary caste; the social structure, based simply on the acquisition (or loss) of wealth and property, was fluid; and there was of course no monarchy or nobility in the United States.

Others however criticize the Golden Liberty, pointing out it was limited only to the nobility, excluding peasants or townsfolk and gave no legal system to grant freedom and liberty to the majority of the population, failing them by failing to protect them from the excesses of the nobility, resulting in the slow development of cities and the second serfdom among the peasants. The Commonwealth was called Noble's Paradise, sometimes—the Jewish Paradise, but also Purgatory for the Townsfolk (Burghers) and Hell for the Peasants. And even among the nobility (szlachta), the Golden Liberty became abused and twisted by the most powerful of them (magnates). However, this "the Jewish Paradise, but also Purgatory for the Townsfolk and Hell for the Peasants" was a statement of social satire, and it should be evaluated whether it reflected the fact of the age. A number of Russian peasants fled from their far more brutal lords to settle in liberal Poland, which might stand out as example of counterevidence to the "Hell for the Peasants" claim.

In its extreme, the Golden Liberty has been criticized as being responsible for "civil wars and invasions, national weakness, irresolution, and poverty of spirit". Failing to evolve into the "modern" system of an absolutist and national monarchy, the Commonwealth suffered a gradual decline down to the brink of anarchy because of liberum veto and other abuses of the system. The liberum veto of the nobility, created the conditions for the "pacifism" of the Sejm in the 17th century. While the Commonwealth had managed to cope with external invasions before 1648, it suffered a complete failure in suppressing internal uprisings, which devastated vast territories, deprived it of a significant portion of its army, and provoked foreign intervention. With the majority of the szlachta believing that they lived in the perfect state, too few questioned the Golden Liberty and the Sarmatism philosophy until it was too late. With the szlachta refusing to pay taxes for a larger and modern army and magnates bribed by foreign powers paralyzing the Commonwealth political system, the Commonwealth was unable to keep up with its increasingly militarized and efficient (through bureaucratization) neighbors, becoming a tempting target for foreign aggression. It was eventually partitioned and annexed by stronger absolutist neighboring countries in the late-18th-century partitions of Poland.

== Similar systems ==
The Golden Liberty created a state that was unusual for its time, but somewhat similar political systems existed in other contemporary states, like the Republic of Venice. (Both states were styled the "Most Serene Republic".)

A similar fate was averted by Italy; first due to a secular inability of the kings of France and Spain, and the Papacy, to come to terms on how to divide the country, then through the reaction against Austrian domination which, as late as 1861, finally aligned most of the country's states in support of a national monarchy under King Victor Emmanuel II of the House of Savoy, hitherto king of Sardinia.

Notably, neither the Republic of Venice nor Italy had a liberum veto among their institutions.

== Proverb ==
The szlachta's rights and privileges became proverbial:

Szlachcic na zagrodzie
równy wojewodzie

—literally,

"The noble on his estate
is equal to the voivode"

or, preserving the Polish original's rhyme scheme:

"The noble behind his garden wall
is the province governor's equal."

To this day, in Poland, this means that a free man (a better sense, today, for szlachcic) regards no man as his superior.

== See also ==
- Executionist movement
- History of democracy
- "Poland is heaven for the nobility, purgatory for townspeople, hell for peasants, paradise for Jews"
