= Pacta conventa (Poland) =

Contract between the Polish nobility and king (1573–1764)

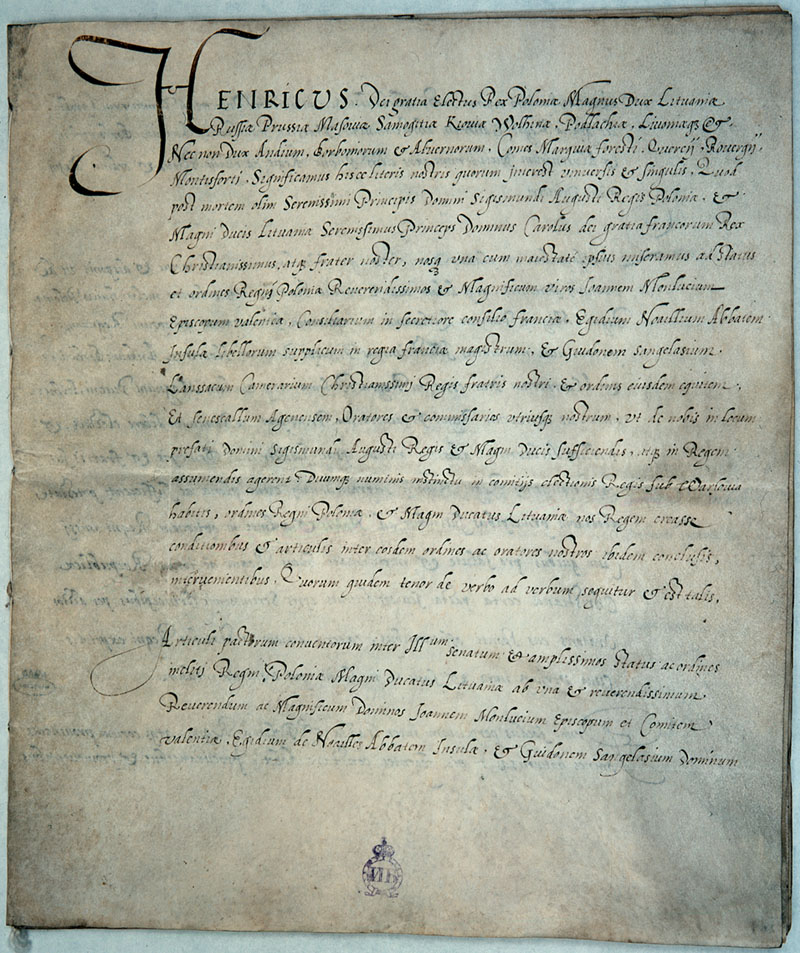
The first pacta conventa, signed by King Henry of Poland, 1573

Pacta conventa (Latin for "articles of agreement") was a contractual agreement entered into between the "Polish nation" (i.e., the szlachta (nobility) of the Polish–Lithuanian Commonwealth) and a newly elected king upon his "free election" (wolna elekcja) to the throne from 1573 to 1764. It declared policies the King would enact once on the throne.

The document was drawn up by the convocation sejm, which elected the King. The pacta conventa affirmed the king-elect's pledge to respect the laws of the Commonwealth and specified policies to be enacted in foreign policy, state finances, the armed forces, public works and other areas. An example of the various concrete undertakings found in a king-elect's pacta conventa is King Władysław IV Vasa's pledge to create a Polish–Lithuanian Commonwealth Navy for the Baltic Sea. Each King's pacta conventa was different based on the specific policies he had promised in order to be elected, making it somewhat similar to a modern political platform or manifesto.

In addition to his own unique pacta conventa, each king-elect was required to sign the Henrician Articles, a set of privileges named after the first king who was supposed to sign it, and who was the only king who did not, Henry of Poland. Unlike the pacta conventa, the Henrician Articles were constant and unchanging. The distinction between the two documents gradually faded away over successive elections. Together, those two documents spelled out most of the critical details of the Commonwealth political system.

== See also ==
- Royal elections in Poland
- Warsaw Confederation
