= Henrician Articles =

Contract between the King of Poland and Polish nobility

The Henrician Articles or King Henry's Articles (Polish: Artykuły henrykowskie; Lithuanian: Henriko artikulai; Latin: Articuli Henriciani) were a constitution in the form of a permanent agreement made in 1573 between the "Polish nation" (the szlachta, or nobility, of the Polish–Lithuanian Commonwealth) and a newly-elected Polish king and Lithuanian grand duke upon his election to the throne. The Articles were the primary constitutional law of the Polish–Lithuanian Commonwealth.

While pacta conventa (a sort of manifesto or government programme) comprised only the personal undertakings of the king-elect, the Henrician Articles were a permanent constitutional law which all King-Grand Dukes were obligated to swear to uphold.

The articles functioned essentially are the first constitution for Poland-Lithuania until the Constitution of 3 May 1791.

== Origins ==
The charter took the form of 18 articles written and adopted by the Polish-Lithuanian nobility in 1573 at the town of Kamień, near Warsaw, during the interregnum after the extinction of the Jagiellon dynasty. The document took its name from that of Henry of Valois, the first Polish king and Lithuanian grand duke elected in a free election. He was obliged to sign the Articles to be allowed to ascend the throne. He nominally agreed to them but refused to formally sign it. Subsequently, every king-elect was required to swear fidelity to them, like the similar documents, the pacta conventa, but the latter were tailored and different for each king-elect. Acceptance by the king-elect of the articles was a condition for his elevation to the throne, and they formed part of the royal oath at the coronation.

== Provisions ==
- The king was to be chosen by election by the szlachta, and his children had no right of inheritance with regard to the throne.
- The king's marriages had to gain the approval of the Senate.
- The king had to convene a general sejm (the Commonwealth Parliament) at least once every two years for six weeks.
- The king had no right to create new taxes, tariffs or such without the approval of the Sejm;
- Between sejms, 16 resident senators were to be at the king's side as his advisers and overseers. The Royal Council of 16 senators was elected every two years during the Sejm's session. Four of their number (rotating every six months) were obliged to accompany the king and serve as advisers and supervisors to ensure that the king made no decision contrary to the laws of the Commonwealth. All royal decrees had to be counterstamped by the chancellors or the deputy chancellors.
- The king had no right to call a pospolite ruszenie (levée en masse) without the approval of the Sejm. Further, the Articles upheld the informal tradition that the king could not send those troops to serve outside the Commonwealth's borders without compensation.
- The standing royal army (wojsko kwarciane) was provided for.
- The king had no right to declare war or peace without the approval of the Sejm.
- The king had to abide by the Warsaw Confederation's guarantees of religious freedom.
- If the king transgressed the law or the nobility's privileges, the szlachta could refuse the king's orders and act against him (in Polish, that became known as the rokosz). Each king had to swear that "if anything has been done by Us against laws, liberties, privileges or customs, we declare all the inhabitants of the Kingdom are freed from obedience to Us".

== See also ==
- Golden Liberty
