= 1587 =

1587 in various calendars
- Gregorian calendar: 1587; MDLXXXVII
- Ab urbe condita: 2340
- Armenian calendar: 1036; ԹՎ ՌԼԶ
- Assyrian calendar: 6337
- Balinese saka calendar: 1508–1509
- Bengali calendar: 993–994
- Berber calendar: 2537
- English Regnal year: 29 Eliz. 1 – 30 Eliz. 1
- Buddhist calendar: 2131
- Burmese calendar: 949
- Byzantine calendar: 7095–7096
- Chinese calendar: 丙戌年 (Fire Dog); 4284 or 4077 — to — 丁亥年 (Fire Pig); 4285 or 4078
- Coptic calendar: 1303–1304
- Discordian calendar: 2753
- Ethiopian calendar: 1579–1580
- Hebrew calendar: 5347–5348
- Hindu calendars
- Vikram Samvat: 1643–1644
- Shaka Samvat: 1508–1509
- Kali Yuga: 4687–4688
- Holocene calendar: 11587
- Igbo calendar: 587–588
- Iranian calendar: 965–966
- Islamic calendar: 995–996
- Japanese calendar: Tenshō 15 (天正１５年)
- Javanese calendar: 1506–1507
- Julian calendar: Gregorian minus 10 days
- Korean calendar: 3920
- Minguo calendar: 325 before ROC 民前325年
- Nanakshahi calendar: 119
- Thai solar calendar: 2129–2130
- Tibetan calendar: མེ་ཕོ་ཁྱི་ལོ་ (male Fire-Dog); 1713 or 1332 or 560 — to — མེ་མོ་ཕག་ལོ་ (female Fire-Boar); 1714 or 1333 or 561

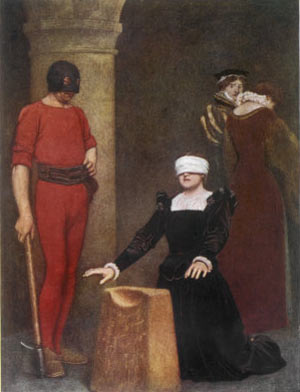
February 8: Mary, the former Queen of Scotland, is executed for conspiring to assassinate Queen Elizabeth of England.

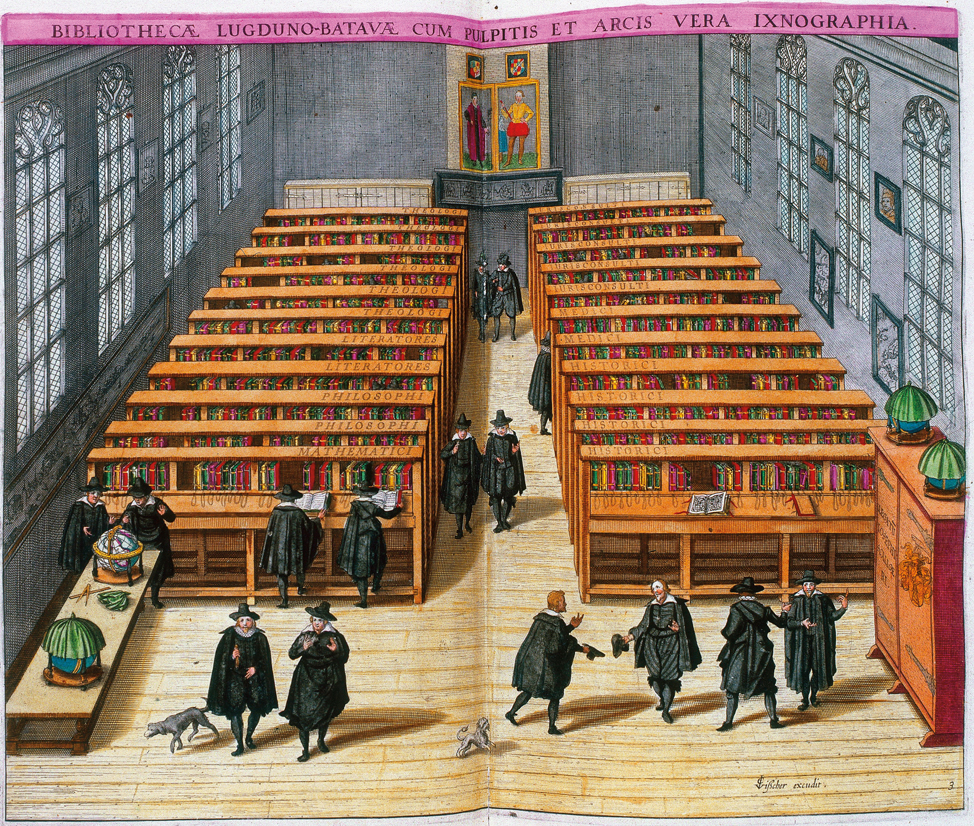
October 31: Leiden University Library is opened.

1587 (MDLXXXVII) was a common year starting on Thursday of the Gregorian calendar and a common year starting on Sunday of the Julian calendar, the 1587th year of the Common Era (CE) and Anno Domini (AD) designations, the 587th year of the 2nd millennium, the 87th year of the 16th century, and the 8th year of the 1580s decade. As of the start of 1587, the Gregorian calendar was 10 days ahead of the Julian calendar, which remained in localized use until 1923.

== Events ==
=== January–March ===
- January 7 – Sir Walter Raleigh appoints John White to be the Governor of the Roanoke Colony, to be established later in the year by English colonists on Roanoke Island off the coast of the modern-day U.S. state of North Carolina. White and 121 other colonists depart from Portsmouth on three ships on May 8 and arrive at Croatoan Island on July 22.
- January 14 – In Japan, Chancellor of the Realm Toyotomi Hideyoshi ends Portugal's control of the port of Nagasaki after six years. Omura Sumitada had leased the fishing village to Portuguese Jesuits on August 15, 1580.
- February 5 (1st waxing of Tabaung 948 ME) – King Nanda of Burma appoints his eldest son and heir apparent, Minye Kyawswa II, as Viceroy of Ava, later part of upper Burma, with a capital at Inwa (located in the modern-day Mandalay Region of Myanmar).
- February 8 – Mary, Queen of Scots, the monarch of Scotland from 1542 to 1567, is beheaded in front of 300 witnesses at Fotheringhay Castle, seven days after the signing of a death warrant by her cousin, Queen Elizabeth of England. Mary has been convicted of treason for her role in the Babington Plot, a conspiracy to overthrow the English government and to assassinate Elizabeth.
- February 12 – A period of exceptionally severe cold begins in western Europe and lasts until February 24.
- February 27 – Sir Anthony Cope, a member of the English Parliament, is imprisoned in the Tower of London after presenting a Puritan revision of the Anglican Book of Common Prayer to the Speaker of the House of Commons, Sir John Puckering. He is released on March 23.
- March 6 – In west Africa, Álvaro II Nimi a Nkanga becomes the new ruler of the Kingdom of Kongo, with a capital at São Salvador in what becomes the city of M'banza-Kongo in the northern part of the Republic of Angola, and including parts of the Republic of the Congo and the Democratic Republic of the Congo. Alvaro II claims the throne upon the dath of his father, Álvaro I Nimi a Lukeni lua Mvemba.
- March 15 – English sailor Sir Francis Drake accepts a privateering commission from Queen Elizabeth to disrupt shipping routes in order to slow supplies from Italy and Andalucia to Lisbon, to trouble enemy fleets in their home ports, to capture Spanish treasure ships and to attack the Spanish Armada if it were to sail for England. On 12 April, his fleet sails from Plymouth.

=== April–June ===
- April 20 (14th waxing of Kason 949 ME) – Burmese–Siamese War (1584–1593): Burma's siege of Ayutthaya (now in Thailand), capital of the Ayutthaya Kingdom, fails after six months as the troops of Burma's King Nanda Bayin begin their withdrawal.
- April 29 – Singeing the King of Spain's Beard: On his expedition against Spain, English sailor Sir Francis Drake leads a raid in the Bay of Cádiz, sinking or capturing at least 30 ships of the Spanish fleet, delaying by a year the sailing of the Spanish Armada for England.
- May 8 – The second expedition to establish an English colony at Roanoke Island in North America departs from England with two ships, supplies, and 121 people under the command of John White.
- May 19 – John Davis sets out from Dartmouth, Devon, for a third attempt to find the Northwest Passage.
- June 8 – Sir Francis Drake captures Portuguese carrack the São Filipe, laden with treasure from the Indies, off the Azores. Its cargo is valued at £108,000 (equivalent to £31,160,465 in 2025), of which 50% goes to Queen Elizabeth and 10% to Drake; it also includes valuable documents relating to the Indies trade.
- June 11 (Tensho 15, 6th day of 5th month) – Most of Kyushu is surrendered to Toyotomi Hideyoshi by Yoshihisa Shimazu, 32 days after Hideyoshi's siege of Kagoshima began (on the 3rd day of the 4th month). Hideyoshi follows on July 24 (19th day of the 6th month of Tensho 15) with an order banishing all European Christian missionaries from the province.
- June 20 – Gabriel VIII becomes the new Pontiff of the Coptic Christian Church in Egypt, being enthroned as Pope Gabriel VIII and filling a vacancy that had existed for nine months since the death of Pope John XIV of Alexandria. Gabriel will reign until his death on May 14, 1603.

=== July–September ===
- July 22 – Roanoke Colony: A group of English settlers arrive on Roanoke Island off North Carolina, to re-establish the deserted colony.
- August 18 – According to legend, Saul Wahl is named king of Poland; he is deposed the following day.
- August 19 – Polish and Lithuanian nobles elect Sigismund III Vasa, King of Sweden, as the ruler of the after the death in December of the previous King of Poland and Duke of Lithuania, Stephen Báthory.
- August 22 – A small group of nobles who oppose Sigismund Vasa as King vote to proclaim Maximilian III, Archduke of Austria, as ruler of the Polish–Lithuanian Commonwealth, a decision supported by the Primate of Poland, Stanisław Karnkowski. The divide begins the War of the Polish Succession.
- August 27 – Governor John White leaves the Roanoke Colony to get more supplies from England.
- September 9 – In the Burgundian Netherlands (part of modern-day Belgium), the faculty at the University of Leuven publishes a condemnation of the 34 propositions drawn up by the Jesuit scholar Michel Baius, leading to a campaign by traditional Belgian Catholics against the Jesuits.
- September 22 – The coronation of Vincenzo Gonzaga as Duke of Mantua in Italy takes place.
- September 28 – At Gremi in the modern-day Republic of Georgia, King Alexander II of Kakheti signs an oath of allegiance to Feodor I, the Tsar of all Russia.

=== October–December ===
- October 1 – Shāh ‘Abbās I "The Great" succeeds as Shahanshah of Iran.
- October 7 – Sigismund Vasa and a fleet of Swedish ships land in Poland to confront an invasion by Maximilian III and an Austrian Army.
- October 14 – War of the Polish Succession (1587–1588): Archduke Maximilian of Austria begins the siege of Kraków, while Jan Zamoyski, hetman of the Polish Army, begins the defense of the city.
- October 18 – Landing of the first Filipinos: The first Filipinos in North America land in Morro Bay, near San Luis Obispo in modern-day California.
- October 20 – Battle of Coutras: Huguenot forces under Henry of Navarre defeat Royalist forces under Anne de Joyeuse, favorite of King Henry III of France; Joyeuse is killed.
- October 31 – Leiden University Library opens its doors, after its founding in 1575.
- November 4 – During the circumnavigation of the world by Thomas Cavendish, the English ships capture the Spanish galleon Santa Ana and its treasure of 100 troy pounds of gold (worth 122,000 Spanish pesos) and a total treasure worth 2.1 million pesos.
- November 14 – Davide Vacca is elected to a two-year term as the new Doge of the Republic of Genoa in Italy in a vote by the Grand Council of the Republic.
- November 22 – A final Austrian attack on Kraków by Archduke Maximilian III is repelled by the Polish defenders.
- November 29 – Maximilian III withdraws his forces and the siege of Kraków ends.
- December 27 – Sigismund III Vasa is formally crowned as King Zygmunt Waza of Poland and Duke of Lithuania in a coronation ceremony at Kraków.

=== Date unknown ===
- A severe famine breaks out in Ming dynasty China.
- The Rose (theatre), the first on Bankside in London, is built by Philip Henslowe and functioning by the year's end.
- Pope Sixtus V establishes the canon law office of 'Promoter of the Faith' (promotor fidei), popularly known as the "Devil's advocate" (advocatus diaboli).
- The chapbook Historia von D. Johann Fausten, printed by Johann Spies in Frankfurt, is the first published version of the Faust story.
- Everard Digby's De Arte Natandi, the first treatise on swimming in England, is published.
- St. Dominic's Church, Macau is established.
- Hailuoto, an island in the Bothnian Bay, is separated from the grand parish of Saloinen into an independent parish.

== Births ==
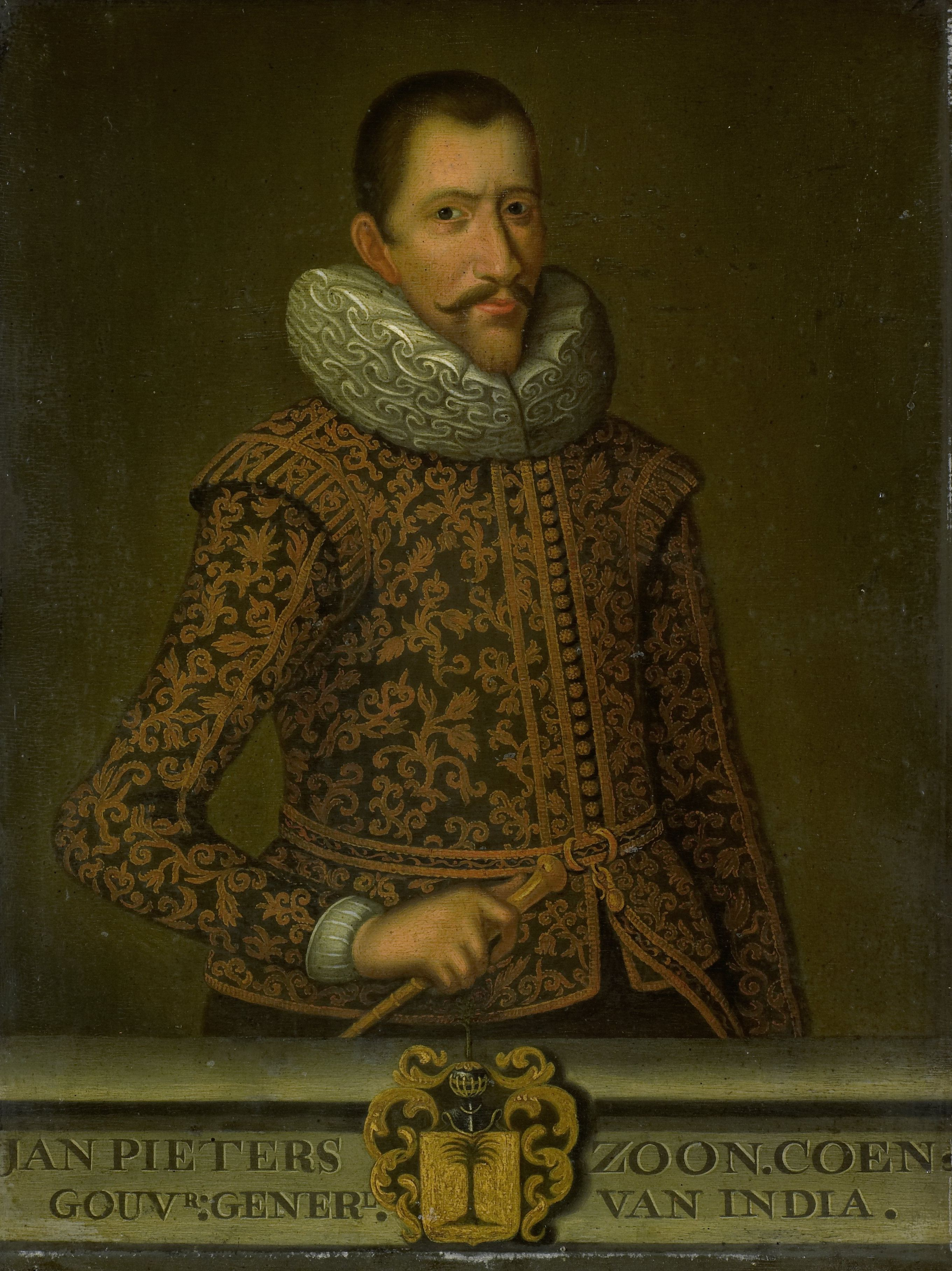
Jan Pieterszoon Coen

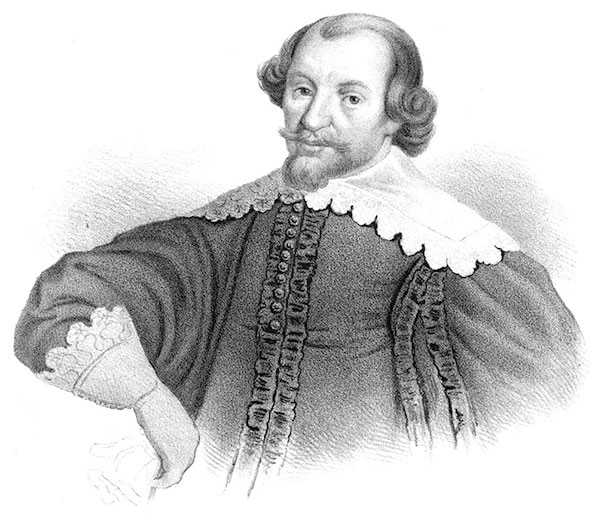
Gabriel Gustafsson Oxenstierna

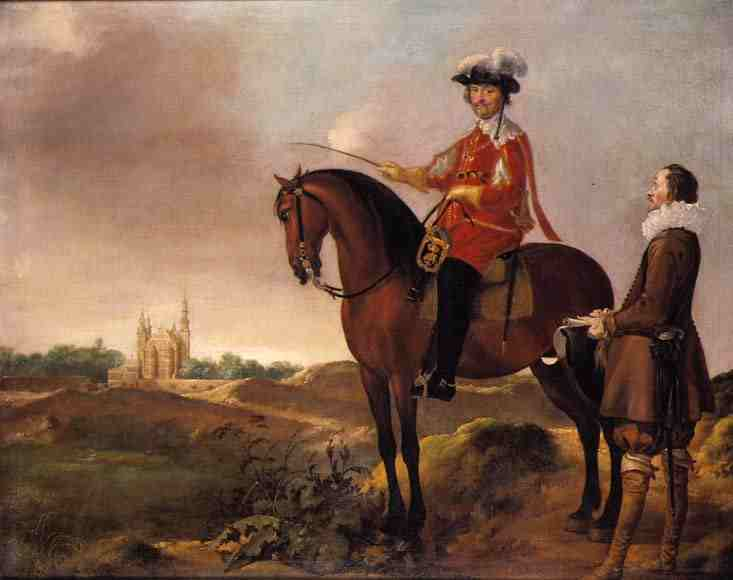
Hans van Steenwinckel the Younger

- January 2 – Anders Arrebo, Danish writer (d. 1637)
- January 5 – Xu Xiake, Chinese adventurer and geographer (d. 1641)
- January 6 – Gaspar de Guzmán, Count-Duke of Olivares, Spanish politician (d. 1645)
- January 8
  - Jan Pieterszoon Coen, Governor-General of the Dutch East Indies (d. 1629)
  - Johannes Fabricius, Frisian/German astronomer (d. 1616)
- January 12 – John Winthrop, English Puritan lawyer (d. 1649)
- February 1 – Pál Esterházy, Hungarian noble (d. 1645)
- February 3 – Dorothea Hedwig of Brunswick-Wolfenbüttel, Princess of Anhalt-Zerbst (d. 1609)
- February 20 – Emanuel Sueyro, Dutch historian, translator, spymaster (d. 1629)
- February 26 – Stefano Landi, Italian composer (d. 1639)
- March 17 – David Lindsay, 1st Lord Balcarres, Scottish politician and noble (d. 1642)
- April 1 – Sir John Mill, 1st Baronet, English politician (d. 1648)
- April 2 – Virginia Centurione Bracelli, Italian saint (d. 1651)
- April 18 – Sir Charles Morrison, 1st Baronet, Member of the Parliament of England (d. 1628)
- April 26
  - Ferdinando Gonzaga, Duke of Mantua, Italian Catholic cardinal (d. 1626)
  - Abraham van der Haagen, Dutch painter (d. 1639)
- April 28 – Krzysztof Ossoliński, Polish nobleman (d. 1645)
- April 29 – Sophie of Saxony, Duchess of Pomerania (d. 1635)
- April 30 – Éléonore de Bourbon, Dutch princess (d. 1619)
- May 7 – Richard Newport, 1st Baron Newport, English politician (d. 1651)
- May 8 – Victor Amadeus I, Duke of Savoy (d. 1637)
- May 17 – Esaias van de Velde, Dutch painter (d. 1630)
- May – Esaias van de Velde, Dutch landscape painter (died 1630)
- May 26 – Susan de Vere, Countess of Montgomery, English noblewoman (d. 1628)
- June 2 – Willem Bontekoe, skipper in the Dutch East India Company (d. 1657)
- June 5 – Robert Rich, 2nd Earl of Warwick, English colonial administrator and admiral (d. 1658)
- June 11 – Sir Thomas Jervoise, English politician (d. 1654)
- June 15 – Gabriel Gustafsson Oxenstierna, Swedish statesman (d. 1640)
- June 21 – Kaspar von Barth, German philologist and writer (d. 1658)
- June 24
  - William Arnold, American settler (d. 1676)
  - Hans van Steenwinckel the Younger, Danish architect (d. 1639)
- July 4 – Magdalene of Bavaria, Consort of Wolfgang William, Count Palatine of Neuburg (d. 1628)
- August 16 – Khusrau Mirza, Mughal prince (d. 1622)
- August 18 – Virginia Dare, Virginia colony settler
- August 23 – Johann Friedrich, Count Palatine of Sulzbach-Hilpoltstein (1614–1644) (d. 1644)
- August 28 – Christian William of Brandenburg, administrator of bishoprics of Magdeburg and Halberstadt (d. 1665)
- September 1 – Gómez Suárez de Figueroa, 3rd Duke of Feria, Spanish general (d. 1634)
- September 3 – Countess Juliane of Nassau-Siegen, Landgravine of Hesse-kassel (d. 1643)
- September 18 – Francesca Caccini, Italian composer
- September 19
  - Robert Sanderson, English theologian and casuist (d. 1663)
  - Mu Zeng, Chinese politician (d. 1646)
- October 8 – Thomas Howard, 1st Earl of Berkshire, English politician (d. 1669)
- October 17 – Nathan Field, English dramatist and actor (d. 1620)
- October 18 – Philippe-Charles, 3rd Count of Arenberg (d. 1640)
- October 19 – Thomas Dacres, English politician (d. 1668)
- October 22 – Joachim Jungius, German mathematician and philosopher (d. 1657)
- October 23 – Sir Gilbert Gerard, 1st Baronet of Harrow on the Hill, English politician (d. 1670)
- November 3 – Samuel Scheidt, German composer (d. 1653)
- November 17
  - Charles Lallemant, French Jesuit (d. 1674)
  - Joost van den Vondel, Dutch dramatist and poet (d. 1679)
- November 25 – Sir Gervase Clifton, 1st Baronet, English politician (d. 1666)
- December 13 – Emmanuel Stupanus, Swiss physician (d. 1664)
- December 19 – Dorothea Sophia, Abbess of Quedlinburg Abbey (1618–1645) (d. 1645)
- December 30 – Simon VII, Count of Lippe-Detmold (1613–1627) (d. 1627)
- date unknown
  - William Feilding, 1st Earl of Denbigh (d. 1643)
  - Francis Kynaston, English courtier and poet (d. 1642)
  - Yun Sŏndo, Korean politician and poet (d. 1671)
  - Song Yingxing, Chinese encyclopedist (d. 1666)
  - George Yeardley, English colonial administrator in America (d. 1627)

== Deaths ==
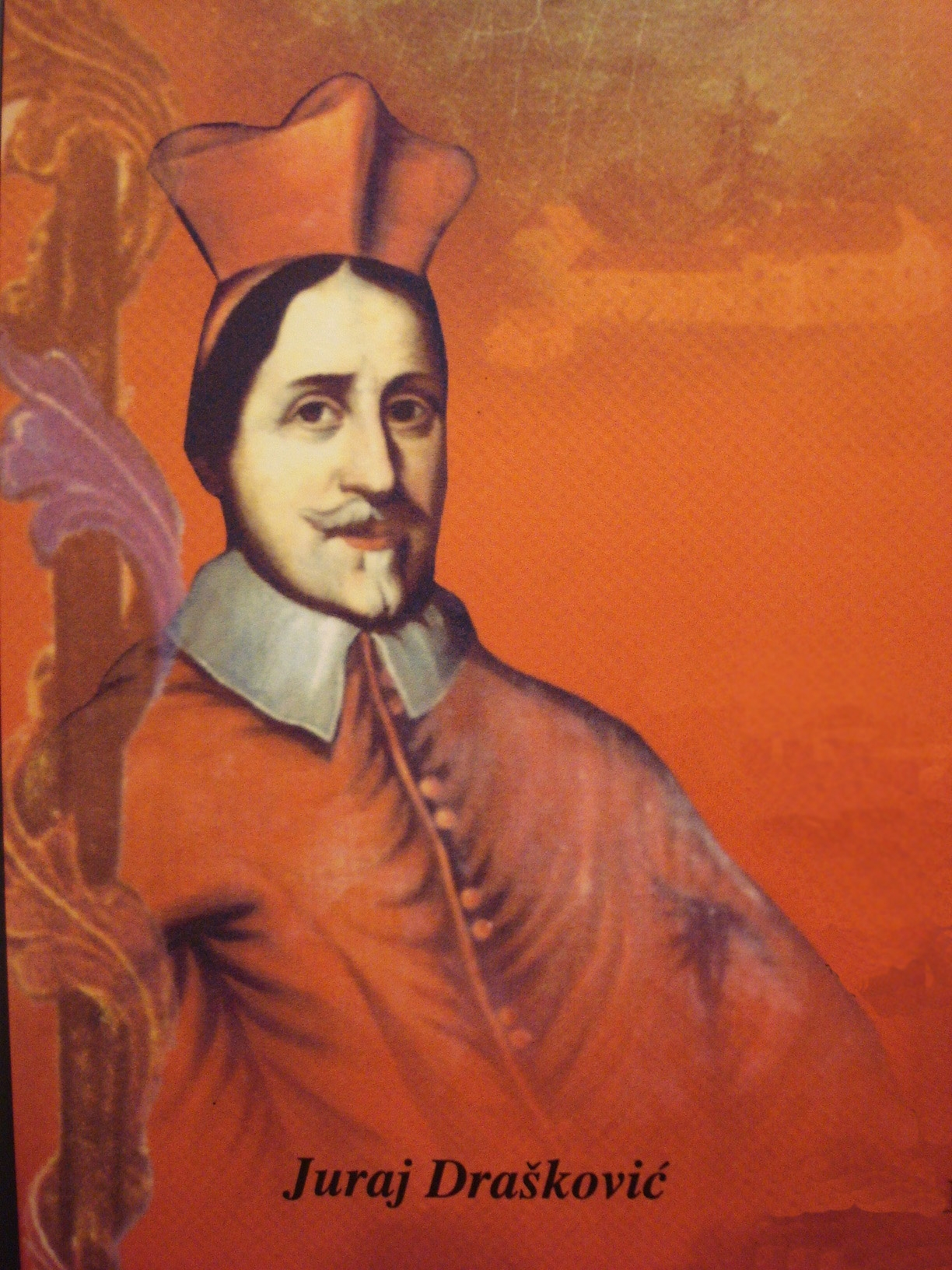
Juraj Drašković

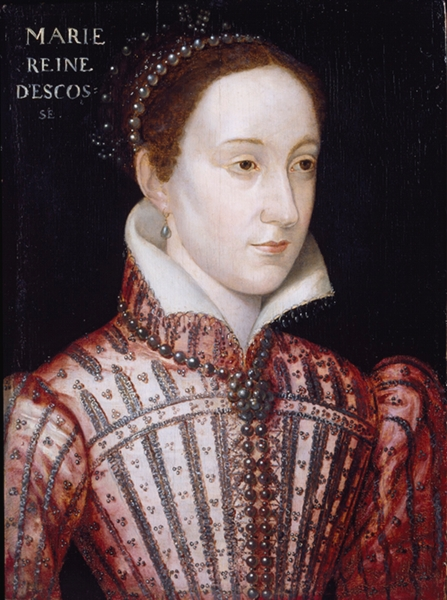
Mary, Queen of Scots

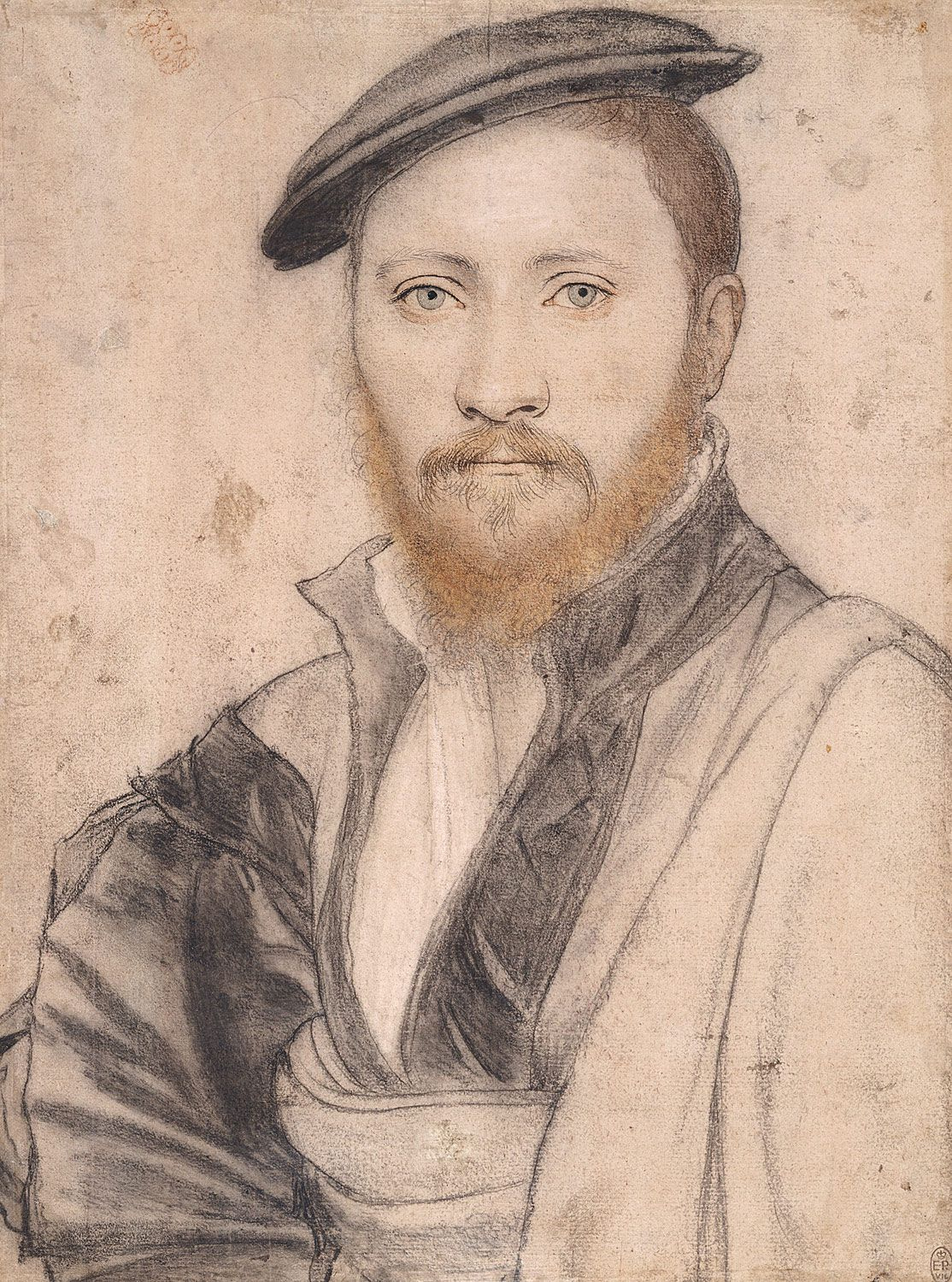
Ralph Sadler

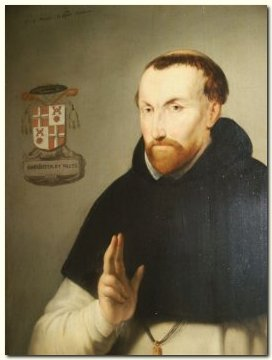
Godfried van Mierlo

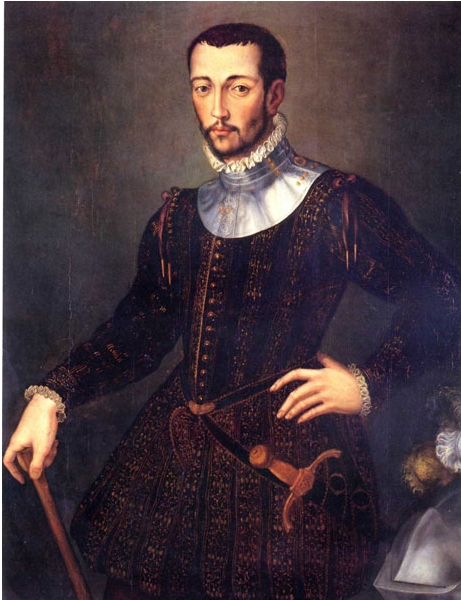
Francesco I de' Medici, Grand Duke of Tuscany

- January 31 – Juraj Drašković, Croatian Roman Catholic cardinal (b. 1525)
- January – Thomas Seckford, English official (b. 1515)
- February 8 – Mary, Queen of Scots (executed) (b. 1542)
- February 9 – Vincenzo Ruffo, Italian composer (b. 1510)
- February 13 – Dorothea of Saxony, Duchess of Brunswick-Wolfenbüttel (b. 1563)
- February 22 – Sophie of Brandenburg-Ansbach, princess of Brandenburg-Ansbach (b. 1535)
- February 26 – Magdalene of Lippe, Countess of Lippe by birth, and Landgravine of Hesse-Darmstadt (b. 1552)
- March 15 – Caspar Olevian, German theologian (b. 1536)
- March 30 – Ralph Sadler, English statesman (b. 1507)
- April 10 – Henry III, Duke of Münsterberg-Oels (b. 1542)
- April 11 – Thomas Bromley, English lord chancellor (b. 1530)
- April 8 – John Foxe, English author (b. 1516)
- April 14 – Edward Manners, 3rd Earl of Rutland (b. 1549)
- April 16 – Anne Seymour, Duchess of Somerset (b. c. 1510)
- May 9 – Jakob Schegk, German physician (b. 1511)
- May 17 – Gotthard Kettler, Duke of Courland and Semigallia (b. 1517)
- May 29 – Ignatius Ni'matallah, Syriac Orthodox patriarch of Antioch (b. c. 1515)
- June 11 – Ōtomo Sōrin, Japanese Christian daimyō (b. 1530)
- June 15 – Frederick II, Duke of Holstein-Gottorp (b. 1568)
- June 23 – Ōmura Sumitada, Japanese Christian daimyō (b. 1533)
- July 7 – Joachim of Zollern, Titular Count of Hohenzollern (b. 1554)
- July 28 – Godfried van Mierlo, Dutch Dominican friar and bishop (b. 1518)
- August 14 – Guglielmo Gonzaga, Duke of Mantua (b. 1538)
- August 29 – Vincenzo Bellavere, Italian composer (b. c. 1540)
- September 3 – Henry Cheyne, 1st Baron Cheyne, English politician and baron (b. 1540)
- September 9 – George Douglas (martyr), Scottish secular priest and martyr (b.c. 1540)
- September 19 – Jacobus Pamelius, Belgian bishop (b. 1536)
- October 19 – Francesco I de' Medici, Grand Duke of Tuscany (b. 1541)
- October 20 – Anne de Joyeuse, Duke of Joyeuse, French commander, (b. 1560)
- November 1 – Alfonso d'Este, Lord of Montecchio, Italian nobleman (b. 1527)
- November 10 – Abe Motozane, Japanese warlord (b. 1513)
- November 13 – Hai Rui, Ming Dynasty "model official" (b. 1514)
- December 11 – Andreas Gaill, German jurist and statesman (b. 1526)
- date unknown
  - Dudley Fenner, English Puritan divine (b. c. 1558)
  - Jan Tarło, Polish nobleman (b. 1527)
- probable – George Whetstone, English writer (b. 1544)
