= 1587 Polish–Lithuanian royal election =

Royal election in the Polish–Lithuanian Commonwealth

1587 Polish-Lithuanian Free election
- June 30, 1587 - August 19, 1587
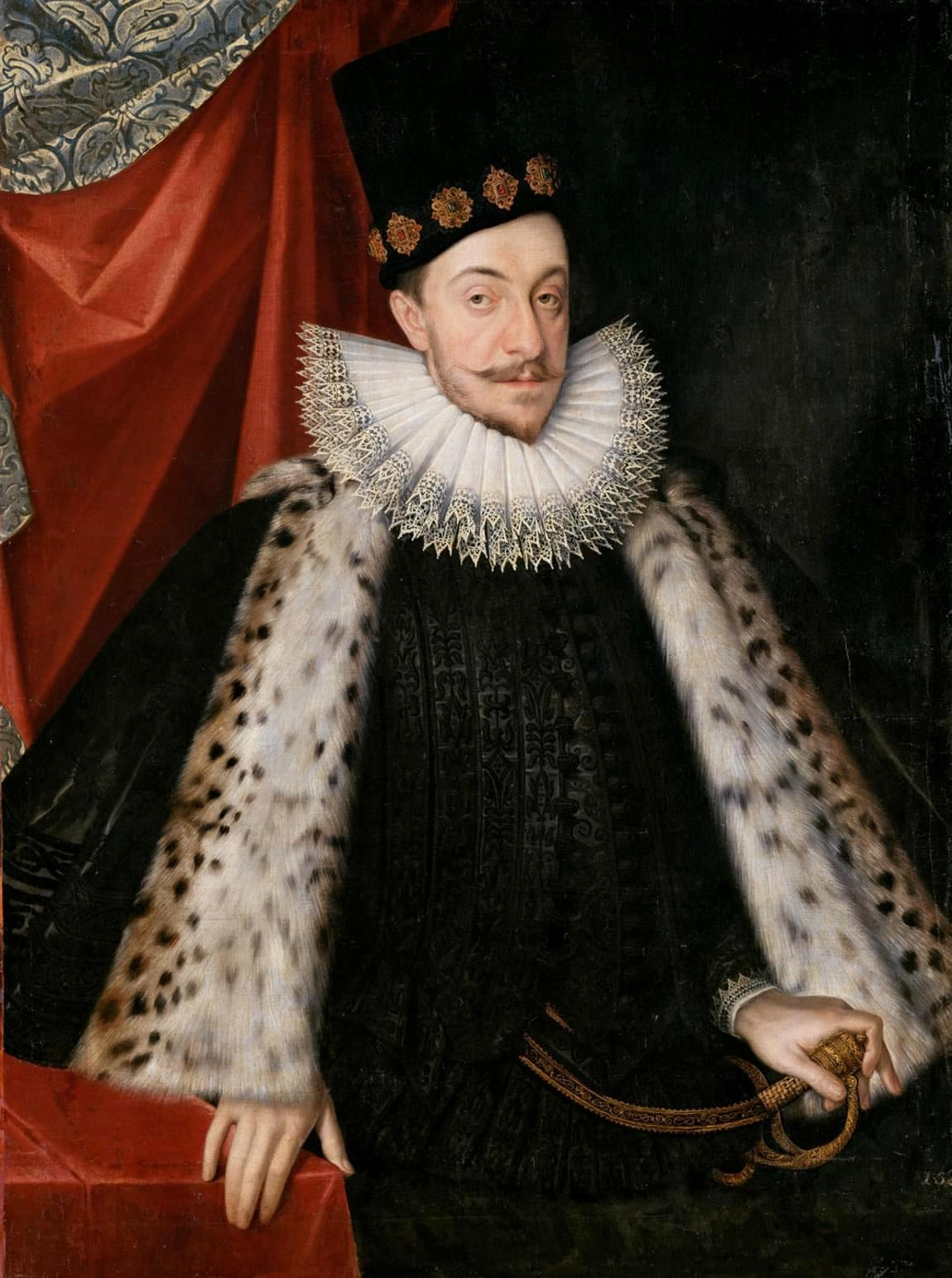

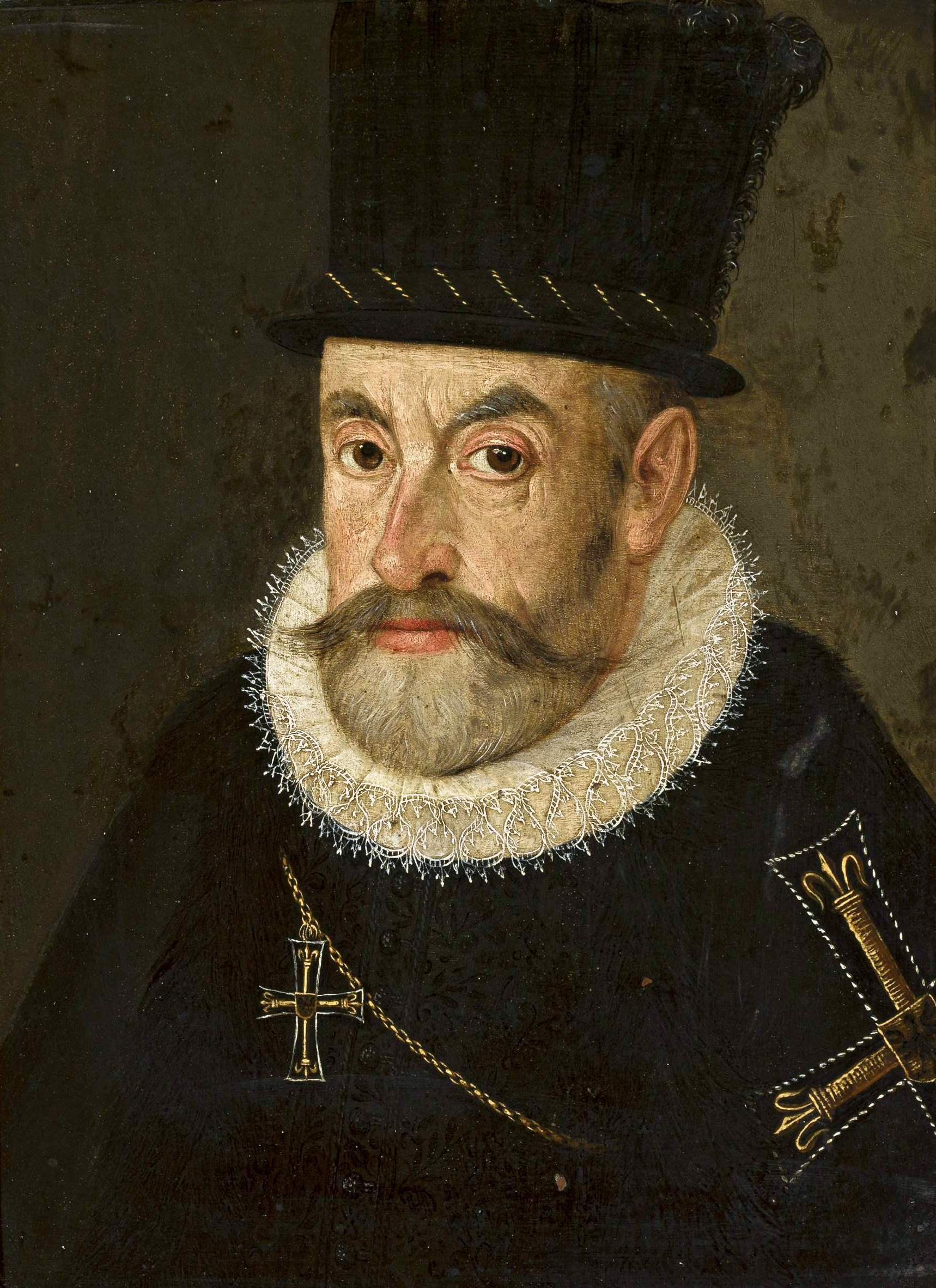
Candidate	Sigismund Vasa	Archduke Maximilian
Faction	Jagiellonian	Pro-Habsburg
Result	Elected	Defeated
Kings before election
Stephen Báthory and Anna Jagiellon
Elected Kings
Sigismund III Vasa

The free election of 1587 was the third royal election to be held in the Polish–Lithuanian Commonwealth, which took place after the death of King Stefan Batory. It began on June 30, 1587, when Election Sejm was summoned in the village of Wola near Warsaw, and ended on December 27 of the same year, when King Sigismund III was crowned in Kraków’s Wawel Cathedral.

== Background ==
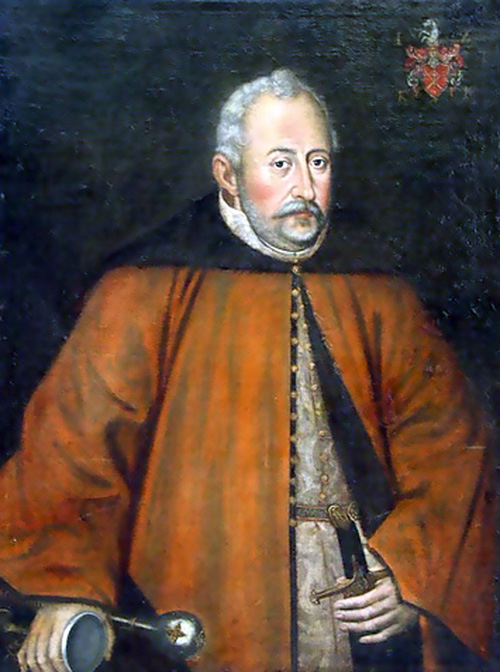
Jan Zamoyski

The death of Stefan Batory (12 December 1586) lead to a third interregnum within 15 years. The Commonwealth was left without a monarch, since Stefan's widow and co-ruler, Anna Jagiellon, had relinquished her claims to the crown. As interrex, Primate and Archbishop of Gniezno, Stanisław Karnkowski, organized the election and met with foreign envoys.

At that time, the Commonwealth was deeply divided between the powerful magnates and the szlachta (nobility). Stefan Batory had been backed by magnate families (the Radziwills, the Zamoyskis, the Lubomirskis), while the szlachta accused him of tyranny (see Samuel Zborowski). Furthermore, there were internal divisions between Polish Crown and the Grand Duchy of Lithuania, also between Polish provinces (Lesser Poland, Mazovia, Greater Poland, Red Ruthenia, Royal Prussia).

The Convocation Sejm began on February 2, 1587, and was immediately marred by arguments between the magnates and the nobility.

== Candidates ==
The Convocation Sejm began on February 2, 1587, and was immediately marred by arguments between supporters of four camps: Habsburg, Swedish/Jagiellon, Muscovy and those who backed a Piast, or a native citizen of the Commonwealth.

The Habsburg candidate was supported by the Zborowski family, Voivode of Poznań Stanislaw Gorka, Bishop of Vilnius Jerzy Radziwiłł, and Sejm Marshal Stanislaw Sedziwoj Czarnkowski. All received large sums of money from Emperor Rudolf II and also by King Philip II of Spain, but an ultra-Catholic, Habsburg candidate was regarded as a threat to religious tolerance, guaranteed by Warsaw Confederation. Another possible candidate, Tsar Feodor I of Russia was supported by the Lithuanians, who hoped that his election would end the never-ending wars between Muscovy and Lithuania. A Piast candidate was liked by the Poles, but opposed by the Lithuanians. Swedish/Jagiellon candidate, Duke Sigismund, son of Katarzyna Jagiellonka and Swedish King John III, was backed by Anna Jagiellon and one of the most powerful magnates of the Commonwealth, Jan Zamoyski. A Swedish king would guarantee freedom of Baltic Sea shipping, a Polish-Swedish alliance, aimed against Muscovy, and the annexation of Estonia by Poland–Lithuania.

== The election ==
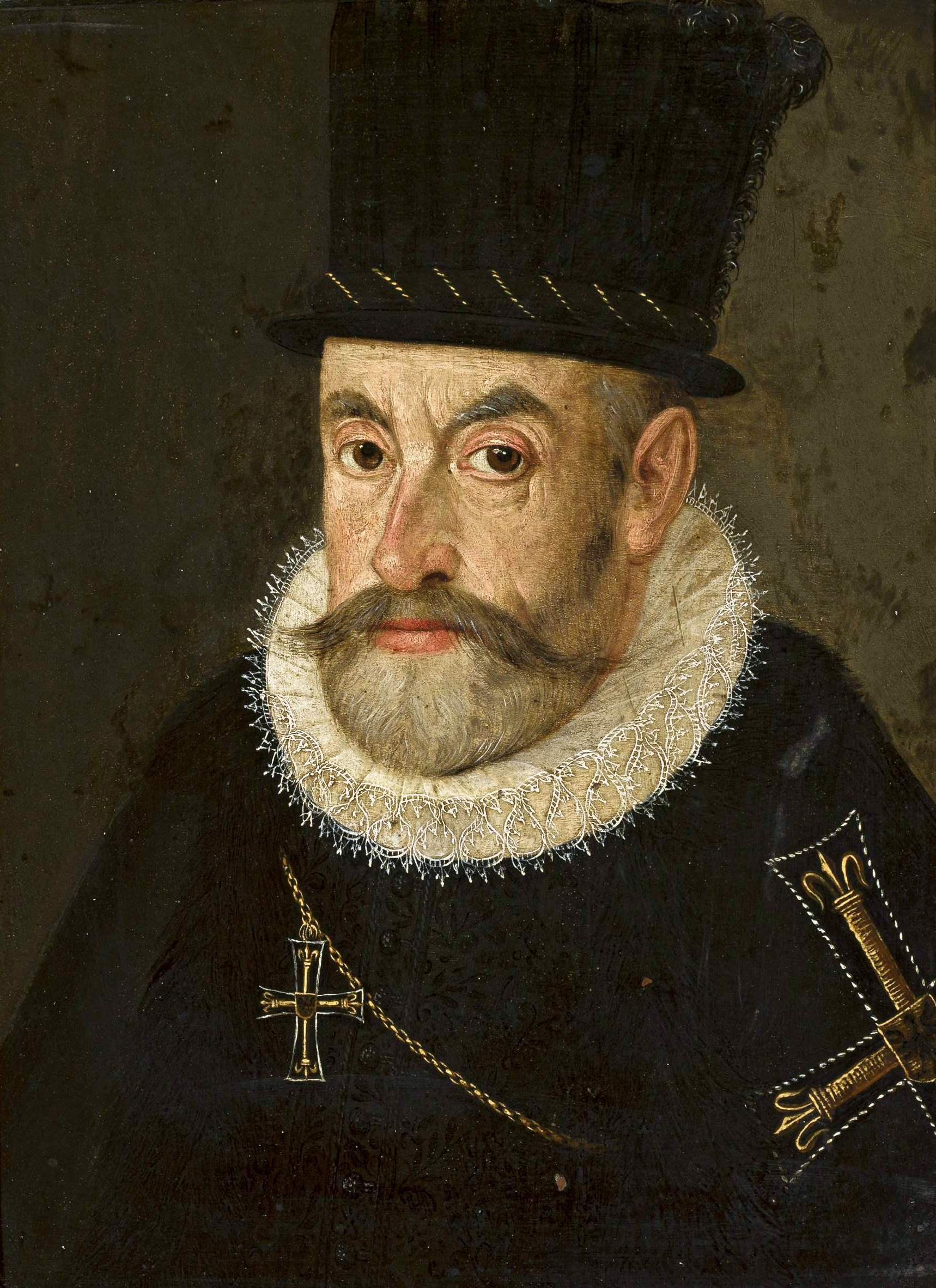
Maximilian III, Archduke of Austria, painting by Hans Henseiller.

Election Sejm was summoned to Wola on June 30, 1587. Polish and Lithuanian magnates came there with their own armed units, and electors were divided into two camps: pro-convocation (pro-Habsburg), with the Zborowski brothers as their leaders, and anti-convocation, headed by Jan Zamoyski.

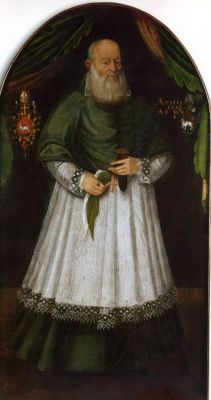
Primate of Poland, Stanisław Karnkowski

For the first weeks, the Sejm was occupied by the death of Samuel Zborowski, and arguments between the Zborowski family and Jan Zamoyski. Since Zamoyski did not want to respond to any questions, rokosz was declared, with the purpose of judging Zamoyski and other officials, connected to the late King Stefan Batory. On July 27, both camps began preparation for military action, and at the last moment, the conflict was defused by Primate Stanisław Karnkowski, Voivode of Sandomierz Stanislaw Szafraniec, and Bishop of Kamieniec Podolski, Wawrzyniec Goślicki, who mediated between the two warring parties.

In early August 1587, the Swedish envoy Erik Larsson Sparre came to Wola and praised Duke Sigismund in a speech, which impressed the nobility and the magnates, including Zamoyski, Karnkowski, Crown Marshal Andrzej Opalinski, and Albert Laski. On August 19, the Primate nominated Sigismund to the throne, but three days later, the pro-convocation camp declared Maximilian III, Archduke of Austria the new king of Poland (none was supported by the Grand Duchy of Lithuania). Both Sigismund and Maximilian accepted the Polish throne, which resulted in the War of the Polish Succession.

== Aftermath ==
On September 27, 1587 in Olomouc, Maximilian of Habsburg took on the title of King of Poland and Grand Duke of Lithuania, and swore to observe the pacta conventa. After several weeks, he entered the Commonwealth with an army of some 5,000 (plus 1,500 Polish supporters). Maximilian planned to capture Kraków, but failed to do so, and gave up the siege on November 30.

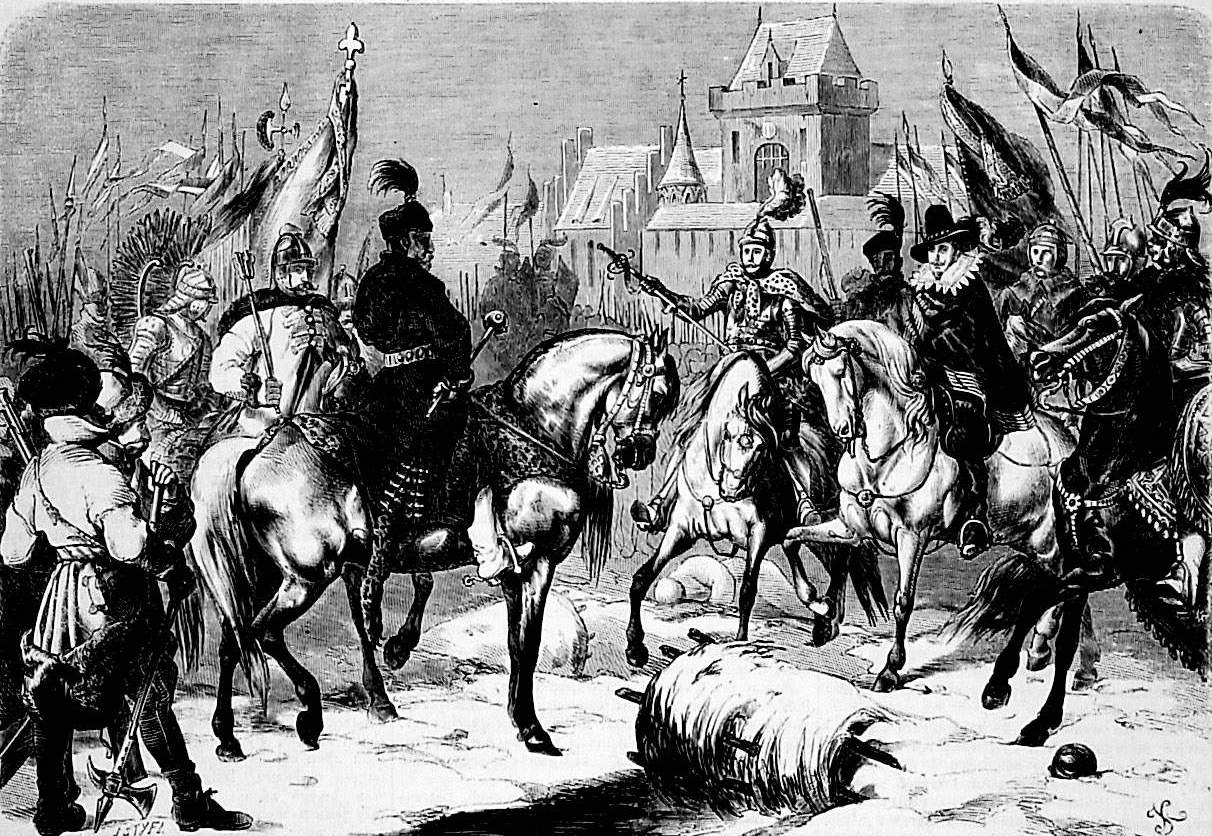
"The Austrian surrender of Archduke Maximilian at Byczyna", painting by Juliusz Kossak

On August 24, Swedish envoys Erik Brahe and Erik Larsson Sparre swore the pacta conventa, without waiting for Duke Sigismund, who was on his way from Sweden. Sigismund Vasa anchored at Gdańsk on September 29, and was welcomed by Bishop of Przemysl, Wojciech Baranowski. Following his father's order, Sigismund stayed on the ship, as he disagreed with one of Polish conditions, which was incorporation of Swedish-ruled Estonia into the Commonwealth. Finally, on October 7, Sigismund swore to observe the pacta conventa at the Oliwa Cathedral, and on December 9, 1587, he entered Kraków, where he was crowned on December 27.

On January 24, 1588, the army of Maximilian of Habsburg was defeated by Jan Zamoyski in the Battle of Byczyna. Maximilian, together with his court, was interned in Krasnystaw. The conflict was ended in early spring of 1589, during the so-called Pacification Sejm. Supporters of Maximilian swore their allegiance to Sigismund, and were allowed to return to the Commonwealth.

== Sources ==
- S. Grzybowski, Dzieje Polski i Litwy (1506–1648), pod red. S. Grodziskiego, w: Wielka Historia Polski, Kraków 2003
- U. Augustyniak, Historia Polski 1572–1795, Warszawa 2008
- S. Cynarski, Zygmunt August, Wrocław 2004
- Z. Wójcik, Wiek XVI-XVII, Warszawa 1991
- M. Markiewicz, Historia Polski 1494–1795, Kraków 2002
