= Battle of Byczyna =

Deciding battle of the 1587–1588 War of the Polish Succession

Coordinates: 51°6′48″N 18°15′45″E

- Part of the War of the Polish Succession (1587-1588)
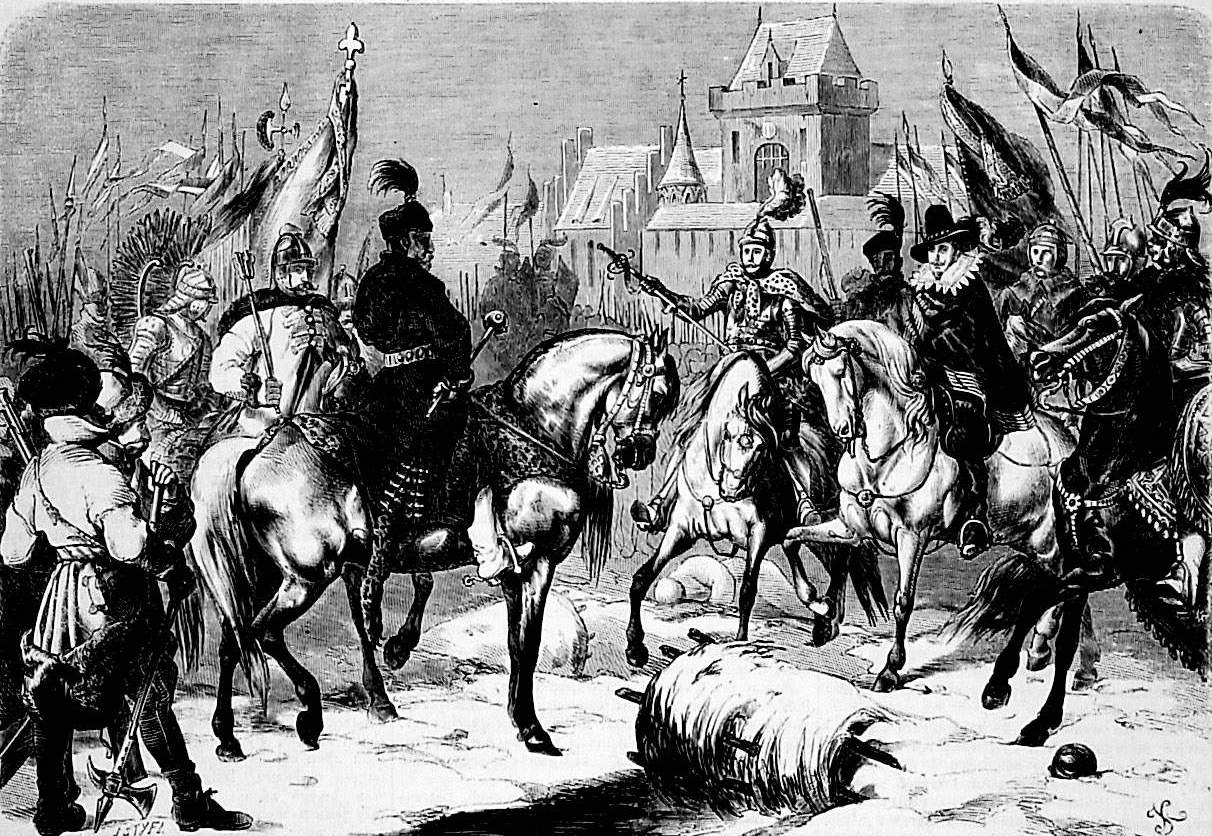
- Poddanie się Arcyksięcia Maksymiliana pod Byczyną, Juliusz Kossak
Date	24 January 1588
Location	Byczyna, Silesia
Result	Polish–Lithuanian victory

Belligerents
Poland–Lithuania	Archduchy of Austria

Commanders and leaders
Jan Zamoyski	Maximilian III (POW)

Strength
6,000	6,500

Casualties and losses
1,000 killed	2,000 killed

The Battle of Byczyna, also known as the Battle of Pitschen (German: Pitschen; Polish: Byczyna), was the deciding battle of the 1587–1588 War of the Polish Succession, which erupted after two rival candidates were elected to the Polish throne. The two opposing sides had forces nearly evenly matched, with armies about 6,000 strong, roughly half infantry and half cavalry. The battle was an overwhelming victory for the Polish-Swedish faction, led by the Swedish-born king-elect Sigismund III Vasa, over the army of his rival to the throne, Maximilian III, Archduke of Austria.

Taking place near the Silesian town of Pitschen (modern Byczyna), then just a few kilometres outside the territory of Poland–Lithuania, on 24 January 1588, Sigismund's supporters were commanded by Chancellor and Great Crown Hetman Jan Zamoyski. Besides the commanders, notable participants included Stanisław Stadnicki on Maximilian's side, and Stanisław Żółkiewski on Sigismund's. The army of the Polish-Austrian (or Habsburg) faction was largely annihilated, the Archduke was captured and his cause came to an abrupt end. He subsequently renounced his claim to the Polish throne.

== Background ==
In 1586, following the death of the previous Polish king, Stefan Bathory, the Swedish duke Sigismund III Vasa and Habsburg Maximilian III, Archduke of Austria, took part in the election to the joint Polish–Lithuanian throne. Each of the two candidates had supporters in the Polish–Lithuanian Commonwealth with the two opposing sides gathered around the pro-Sigismund Chancellor and Great Crown Hetman Jan Zamoyski and the Primate of Poland, Stanisław Karnkowski on one side and the pro-Maximilian Zborowski family on the other. The rivalry between the Zamoyski and Zborowski families dated years past and tensions during the elections ran high.

Sigismund, supported by Zamoyski and the former king's wife, Anna Jagiellon, was elected King of the Polish–Lithuanian Commonwealth on 19 August 1587 and recognized as such by the interrex, the Primate Karnkowski. The election was disputed, however, by Maximilian and opponents of Sigismund chose not to respect the election outcome, decreeing that Maximilian was the rightful monarch three days later on 22 August. The Zborowski family called for a rokosz (legitimate right to rebel) and the election ended in chaos, with several killed and many wounded. For both the Zamoyski and Zborowski families, losing was not an option, as they knew the losing side would likely pay a severe price, from confiscations and loss of prestige to a possible death sentence for treason.

Neither Sigismund nor Maximilian were present in the Commonwealth at that time. After receiving news of the election, both Sigismund and Maximilian made haste for Poland. Sigismund arrived at Gdańsk on 28 September and, after approximately two weeks, he had departed to Kraków, where he arrived on 9 December and was crowned on 27 December.

Maximilian attempted to resolve the dispute by bringing a military force to Poland, thereby starting the War of the Polish Succession. After a failed attempt to take Kraków in late 1587, successfully defended by Zamoyski, he retreated to gather more reinforcements but was pursued by the forces loyal to Sigismund. Zamoyski at first wanted to avoid a large battle, as he hoped for more reinforcements and supplies, but, when it became apparent that Maximilian would be reinforced first, he decided to press an attack. He also received the king's permission to cross the border and attack Maximilian in Silesia. Zamoyski divided his army into several regiments that were able to march quickly, at approximately 24 kilometers a day. He reformed his army after a week near Częstochowa. In the meantime, on 22 January 1588, Maximilian crossed the border into his own territory, towards Byczyna (Pitschen).

== Opposing forces ==
Each side had comparable forces: Maximilian had about 6,500 men, about half of which (3,290) were infantry. His forces consisted primarily of Silesians, Hungarians, and Moravians, with artillery consisting of four heavy and a dozen or so lighter pieces. Zamoyski's forces numbered about 6,000, including 3,700 cavalry, 2,300 infantry, and several cannon. Maximilian's Polish supporters included 600 cavalry under the command of the "devil of Łańcut" Stanisław Stadnicki. Another of Maximilian's notable Polish supporters at the battle was the poet Adam Czahrowski. Overall Maximilian's forces held the advantage in infantry, while Zamoyski's was in cavalry. The Poles favored cavalry, which had supreme mobility and used effective charging tactics, but also meant that their infantry was geared too much towards cavalry support.

== The battle ==
On the night of 24 January the Archduke's army took positions east of the small town of Byczyna on the royal road leading into Poland. They felt secure in their camp, on the Habsburg side of the border, and did not expect the Poles to cross. Zamoyski marshaled his forces into three lines and was able to position them at an angle to the opponent's line.

The exact position of the Polish Army is unknown, but part of the Polish right flank, moving quietly in the dense mist, encircled Maximilian's left flank. After the mist began to clear the Archduke realized his force was being flanked and his retreat to Byczyna was threatened. He ordered an attack, but a miscommunication of his orders confused part of his army and the Hungarian regiment began to retreat. The Polish left wing, under command of future Hetman Stanisław Żółkiewski, dispersed the opposing units. The battle saw more infantry action than many others of the Commonwealth but, even so, the Polish cavalry (Polish winged hussars) played a major part. The battle began with some duels between elears (cavalry champions), soon followed by Polish cavalry charges on the left flank and in the center, which did not result in any significant breakthroughs for either side. Zamoyski is said to have commanded the battle very well, turning it at several points. Eventually a Polish hussar counterattack on the left flank mauled Maximilian's Hungarian cavalry and forced his army to start giving ground. The bloody retreat quickly turned into a general rout during which the Archduke's army suffered heavy casualties.

The entire battle lasted approximately one to two hours. Maximilian took refuge in Byczyna, but the Poles took control of his artillery and turned the guns on the town. Before the Polish forces began their assault, Maximilian surrendered and was taken prisoner. The battle, therefore, ended up being the decisive victory for the Polish-Swedish faction.

== Aftermath ==
Exact casualties are unknown, but the Archduke's army suffered heavier losses, estimated at 2,000, whereas the Poles lost about 1,000 men. Żółkiewski captured an enemy standard, but received a knee wound which lamed him for life. After the intervention of a papal envoy, Maximilian was released, but only after spending thirteen months as a "guest" of Zamoyski. In the Treaty of Bytom and Będzin (signed on 9 March 1589), Maximilian pledged to renounce the Polish crown, and Rudolf II, Holy Roman Emperor, pledged not to make any alliances against Poland with Muscovy or Sweden. The town of Lubowla, taken early in the conflict by Maximilian, was returned to Poland. Upon his return to Vienna he failed to honor his pledge and renounce his claim to the Polish crown and would not do so until 1598.
