= Siege of Kraków (1587) =

1587 siege

- Part of War of the Polish Succession (1587–1588)
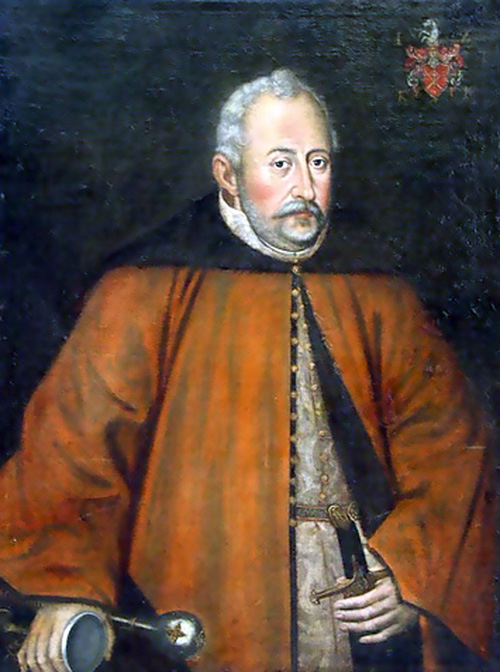
- Grand Hetman of the Crown, Jan Zamoyski, led the defence of Kraków in 1587
Date	14 October – 29 November 1587
Location	Kraków 50°03′41″N 19°56′14″E
Result	Polish-Lithuanian victory

Belligerents
Polish–Lithuanian Commonwealth	Archduchy of Austria

Commanders and leaders
(Polish–Lithuanian Commonwealth) Jan Zamoyski	(Austria) Maximilian III

The 1587 siege of Kraków took place between 14 October and 29 November 1587, after the contested 1587 Polish–Lithuanian royal election, which resulted in a double selection of opposing candidates - Zygmunt Waza was elected by the nobility on the 19th of August, while another faction of the gentry chose Maximilian III, Archduke of Austria, on the 22nd of August. Maximillian attempted to enforce his election by force, leading to the War of the Polish Succession (1587-1588), and in the course of the campaign besieged the city of Kraków.

Kraków was defended by the hetman Jan Zamoyski, and a general attack by the pro-Austrian forces was repelled on 22 November. Many affluent burghers of German background participated directly in the defense against "the German enemies", while others donated funds for the city's defense. Several of them were ennobled as a result and admitted into the ranks of the szlachta.
