= Skokówka =

- Village
- Location within Poland
- Coordinates: 50°41′31″N 23°13′58″E
- Country: Poland
- Voivodeship: Lublin
- County: Zamość
- Gmina: Zamość
- Population: 410

Skokówka ([skɔˈkufka]) is a village in the administrative district of Gmina Zamość, within Zamość County, Lublin Voivodeship, in eastern Poland.

Jan Zamoyski (1542–1605), a Polish nobleman, magnate and Grand Hetman of the Crown, was born in Skokówka.
