= Treaty of Bytom and Będzin =

1589 treaty between Poland-Lithuania and Austria

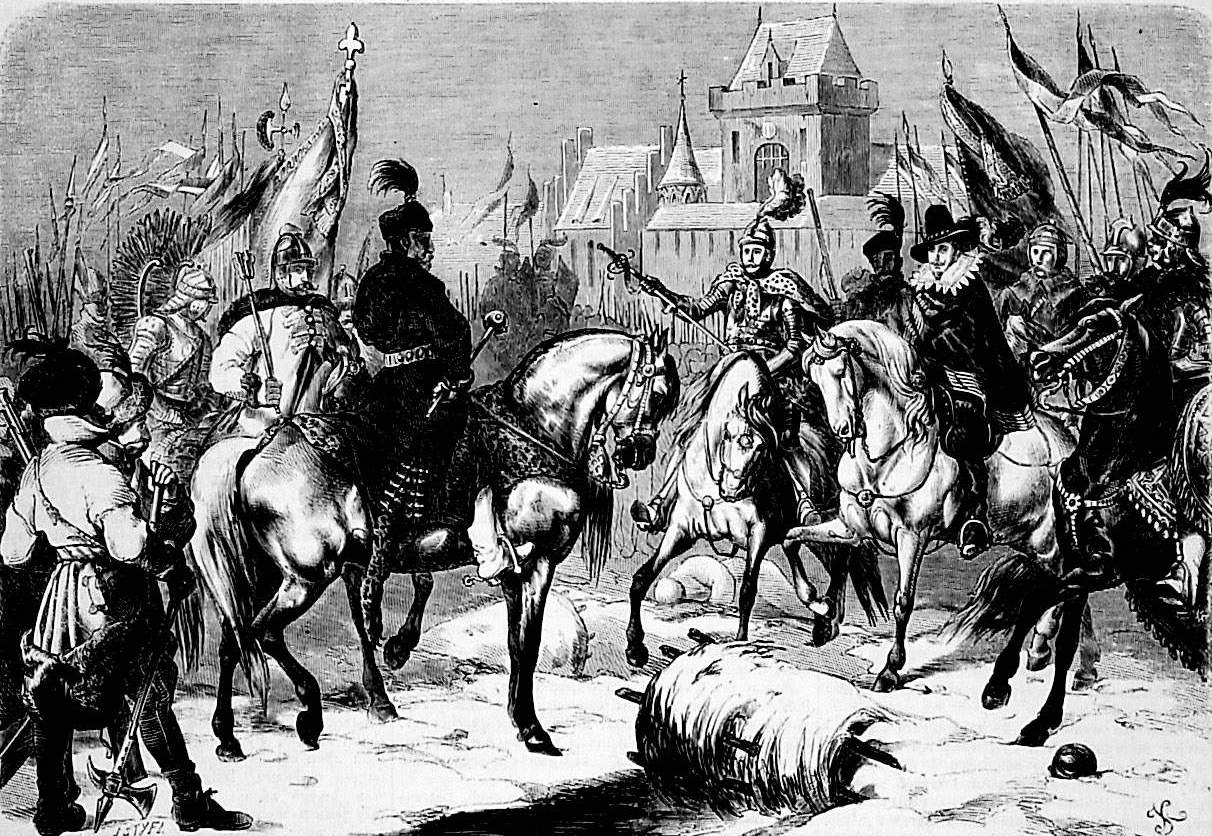
Maximilian surrenders to Zamoyski, 1862 illustration

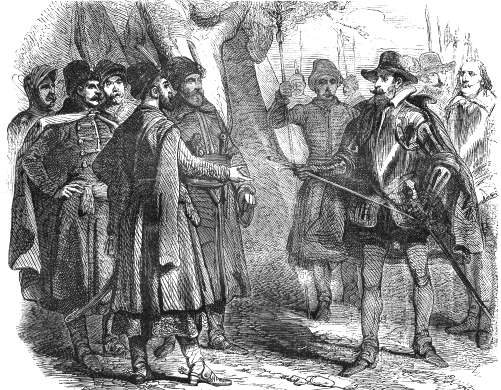
A 19th-century depiction of Zamoyski taking Maximilian as a prisoner of war

Treaty of Bytom and Będzin or Treaty of Będzin and Bytom (Polish: traktat bytomsko-będziński or traktat będzińsko-bytomski) was a treaty signed between the Polish–Lithuanian Commonwealth and the Austrian House of Habsburg on 9 March 1589. It was favorable to the Commonwealth.

== Chronology ==
In the course of War of the Polish Succession, Archduke Maximilian III of Austria was soundly defeated and taken prisoner by Polish chancellor and hetman, Jan Zamoyski, at the Battle of Byczyna in January 1588. Maximilan was treated with courtesy, but nonetheless found himself imprisoned in Commonwealth for over a year; first at Krasnystaw, than at Zamość. His lengthy captivity was a result of a political game played by chancellor Zamoyski, who treated him as useful leverage in international negotiations between Poland, Austria, Sweden and Russia.

Polish-Austrian negotiations were held in the Silesian border towns of Będzin and Bytom, with the Polish delegation staying on their respective sides of the border – Polish, in Będzin, and Habsburg, in Bytom. Polish delegation was represented by Hieronim Rozdrażewski, the bishop of Kujawy, Andrzej Opaliński, the grand marshal, Stanisław Gostomski, the voivode of Rawa, Janusz Ostrogski, the voivode of Volhynia, and Jan Zamoyski, the grand chancellor. Austrian negotiators included bishop Stanislav Pavlovský and burgrave William of Rosenberg. Another notable participant was Cardinal Ippolito Aldobrandini (future Pope Clement VIII), representing the Holy See at the Papal Legate, and acting as the mediator.

The treaty was signed on 9 March 1589. The Polish side utilized their hostage to obtain a number of concessions from the Habsburgs. Maximilian was to renounce the Polish crown and Holy Roman Emperor Rudolf II had to pledge not to make any alliances against Poland with the Muscovy or Sweden, nor to intervene in internal Polish politics in the future periods of interregnum. The Commonwealth and Austria were to be united by "eternal bonds of peace and friendship". The town of Lubowla, taken early in the conflict by Maximilian, was returned to Poland.

Maximilian promised he would renounce his claim to the Polish throne only after crossing the Polish border. Upon his return to Vienna Maximilian failed to honor his pledge and renounce his claim to the Polish crown and would not do so until 1598.

== Importance ==
Polish historian Władysław Konopczyński wrote that the treaty was "an honorabe convention... which for long years to come grounded peace between Poland and the Habsburgs. Leśniewski notes that the treaty led to good Polish-Austrian relations for over a century, listing the Polish relief of Vienna in 1683 as one of the consequences of the resulting good relations, and that the treaty did much to improve the international prestige of the Commonwealth.
