= War of the Polish Succession (1587–1588) =

Wars of succession involving the states and peoples of Europe

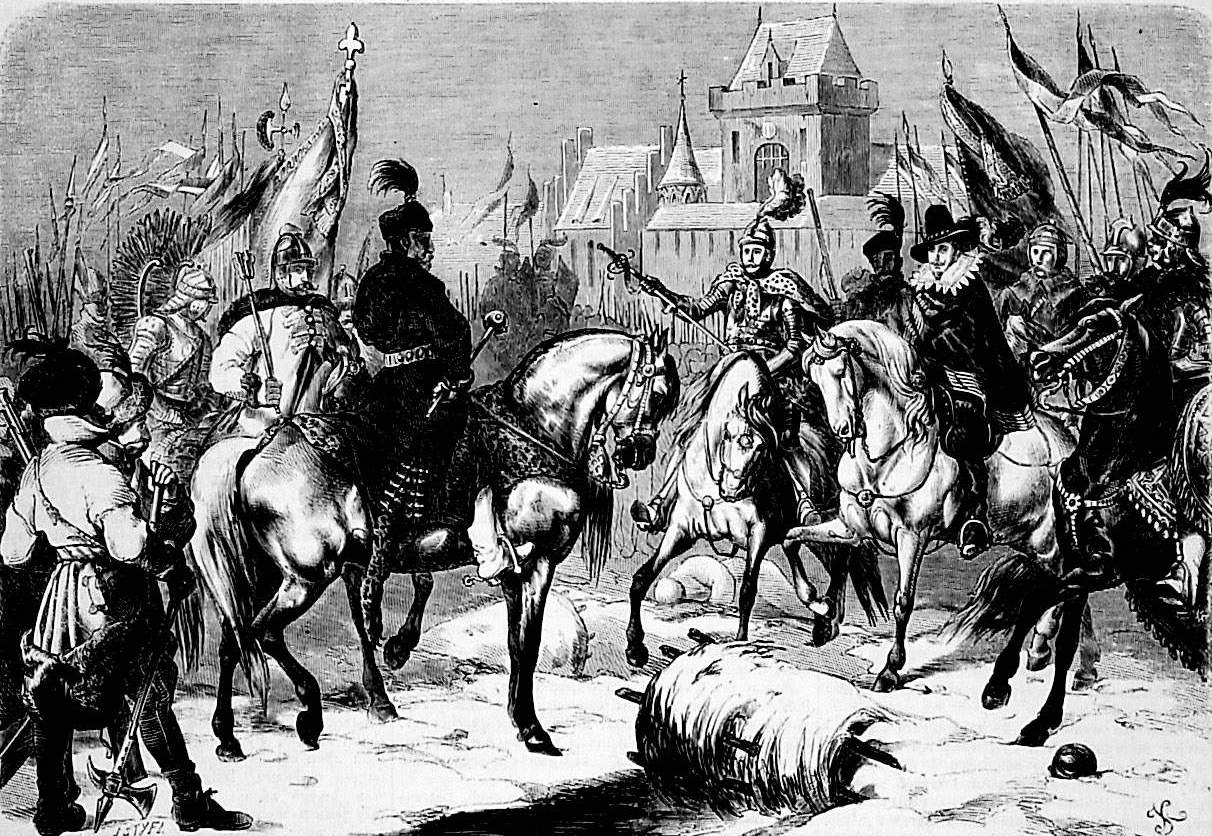
- The Austrian surrender of Archduke Maximilian at Byczyna.
Date	Autumn 1587 – 24 January 1588
Location	Polish–Lithuanian Commonwealth
Result	Pro-Sigismund victory: Treaty of Bytom and Będzin

Belligerents
Supporters of Sigismund Vasa, mainly Poles	Supporters of Maximilian of Austria, mainly Germans, but including many Poles and Hungarians

Commanders and leaders
Jan Zamoyski; Sigismund III Vasa	Maximilian III of Austria; House of Zborowski

The War of the Polish Succession or the Habsburg–Polish War took place from 1587 to 1588 over the election of the successor to the King of Poland and Grand Duke of Lithuania Stephen Báthory. The war was fought between factions of Sigismund III Vasa and Maximilian III, with Sigismund eventually being crowned. Two major battles of this conflict included the Siege of Kraków, in which Maximilian III failed to capture the capital of the Commonwealth, and the Battle of Byczyna, in which Maximilian was forced to surrender. Sigismund's victory was significantly the doing of Chancellor and Hetman Jan Zamoyski, who stood behind both the political intrigue and the military victories of this conflict.

== Background ==
In 1586, following the death of the previous Polish king, Stefan Batory, the Swedish crown prince Sigismund III Vasa and Habsburg Maximilian III, Archduke of Austria, took part in the election to the joint Polish–Lithuanian throne. Each of the two candidates had supporters in the Polish–Lithuanian Commonwealth with the two opposing sides gathered around pro-Sigismund Chancellor and Hetman Jan Zamoyski and the Primate of Poland, Stanisław Karnkowski, on one side and the pro-Maximilian Zborowski family on the other. Bad blood between Zamoyski and the Zborowski family dated years past; tensions during the elections ran high.

Sigismund, supported by Zamoyski and the former king's wife, Anna Jagiellon, was elected King of the Polish–Lithuanian Commonwealth on 19 August 1587 and recognized as such by the interrex, the Primate Karnkowski. However, the election was disputed by the other candidate, Maximilian III of Austria, and opponents of Sigismund chose not to respect the election outcome, decreeing that Maximilian was the rightful monarch three days later, on 22 August. Zborowscy called for the rokosz (legitimate right to rebel) and the election ended in chaos, with several killed and many wounded. For both Zamoyski and Zborowski, losing was not an option, as they knew the losing side would likely pay a severe price, from confiscations and prestige loss to a possible death sentence for treason.

Neither Sigismund nor Maximilian were present in the Commonwealth at that time. After receiving news of his election, both Sigismund and Maximilan made haste for Poland. Sigismund arrived at Gdańsk on 28 September, and after approximately two weeks he had departed to Kraków, where he arrived on 9 December and was crowned on 27 December.

== War ==
Maximilian attempted to resolve the dispute by bringing a military force to Poland – thereby starting the War of the Polish Succession. He took Lubowla, but after a failed attempt to storm Kraków (the capital of Poland) in late 1587, successfully defended by Zamoyski, he retreated to gather more reinforcements, pursued by the forces loyal to Sigismund. While waiting for reinforcements, he was defeated at the Battle of Byczyna in January 1588, and forced to surrender. This marked the end of this conflict.

== Aftermath ==
After the intervention of a Papal envoy and the Spanish diplomacy, Maximilian was released, but only after spending thirteen months as a "guest" of Zamoyski. In the Treaty of Bytom and Będzin (signed on 9 March 1589) Maximilian had to renounce the Polish crown and Rudolf II, Holy Roman Emperor had to pledge not to make any alliances against Poland with Muscovy or Sweden. The town of Lubowla, taken early in the conflict by Maximilian, was returned to Poland. Upon his return to Vienna he failed to honor his pledge and renounce his claim to the Polish crown (he would do so only in 1598). Nonetheless, there would be no serious military tensions between the Commonwealth and the Habsburgs, as each would quickly become concerned with other issues.

== See also ==
- History of Poland (1569–1795)#Founding of the elective monarchy
- History of Poland (1569–1795)#War of the Polish Succession
