= Jan Zamoyski =

Polish magnate (1542–1605)

Hetman Jan Zamoyski
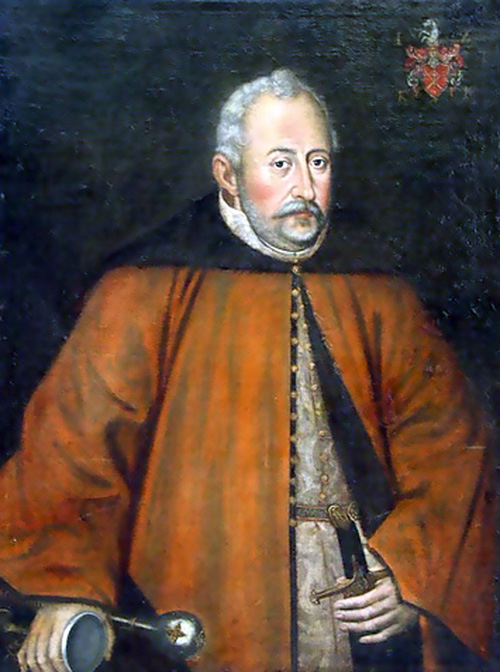
- Portrait by Jan Szwankowski, c. 1602

Grand Crown Chancellor
- In office 1578–1605
- Monarchs: Stephen Bathory; Sigismund III
- Preceded by: Piotr Dunin Wolski
- Succeeded by: Maciej Pstrokoński

Great Crown Hetman
- In office 1581–1605
- Monarchs: Stephen Bathory; Sigismund III
- Preceded by: Mikołaj Mielecki
- Succeeded by: Stanisław Żółkiewski

Personal details
- Born: 19 March 1542 Skokówka, Kingdom of Poland
- Died: 3 June 1605 (aged 63) Zamość, Polish–Lithuanian Commonwealth
- Resting place: Cathedral of the Resurrection, Zamość
- Spouse(s): Anna Ossolińska; Krystyna Radziwiłł; Gryzelda Batory; Barbara Tarnowska
- Children: Tomasz Zamoyski
- Parents: Stanisław Zamoyski (father); Anna Herburt (mother)
- Education: University of Padua
- Occupation: Politician; magnate; soldier
- Noble family: Zamoyski
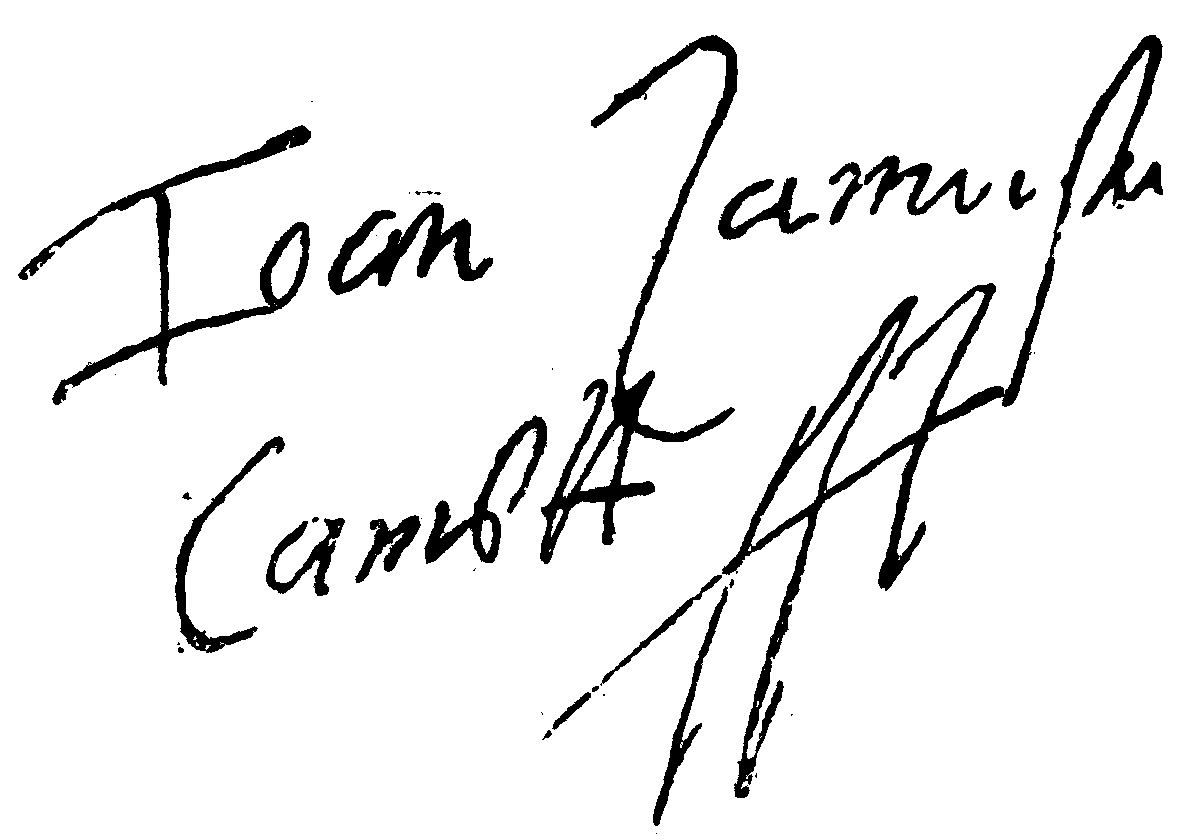
- Signature
- Nickname: Polish Gracchus

Military service
- Allegiance: Polish–Lithuanian Commonwealth
- Years of service: 1565–1605
- Battles/wars: War of the Polish Succession (1587–1588); Siege of Kraków; Battle of Byczyna; Livonian War

Jan Zamoyski (Latin: Ioannes Zamoyski de Zamoscie; 19 March 1542 – 3 June 1605) was a Polish szlachcic (nobleman), magnate, statesman and the first ordynat of Zamość. He served as Royal Secretary from 1565, Deputy Chancellor from 1576, Grand Chancellor of the Crown from 1578, and Great Hetman of the Crown from 1581.

Zamoyski was the general starost of the city of Kraków from 1580 to 1585, and starost of Bełz, Międzyrzecz, Krzeszów, Knyszyn, and Tartu. An important advisor to the Polish kings Sigismund II Augustus and Stephen Báthory, he was one of the major opponents of Báthory's successor, Sigismund III Vasa, and one of the most skilled diplomats, politicians and statesmen of his time, standing as a major figure in the politics of the Polish–Lithuanian Commonwealth throughout his life.

== Biography ==
=== Childhood and education ===
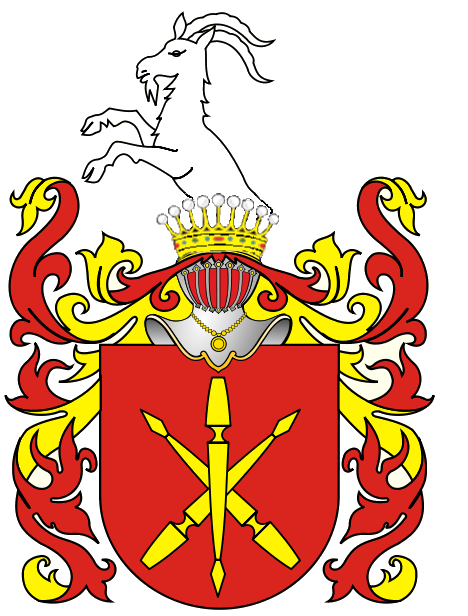
Zamoyski coat of arms

Jan Zamoyski was born on 19 March 1542 to Stanisław Zamoyski and Anna Herburt in Skokówka. He started his education in a school in Krasnystaw, but when he was thirteen years old, he was sent to study abroad; from 1555 to 1559, he was a page at the royal court in Paris. Already at this young age he attended lectures at the Sorbonne University and Collège de France. In 1559 he briefly visited Poland, then attended the University of Strasbourg; after a few months there he moved to University of Padua, where from 1561 he studied law and received a doctorate in 1564. During his years abroad he converted from Calvinism to Roman Catholicism.

During his education, he became active in university politics, and in 1563, he was elected the rector of the law department. Around that time he also wrote De senatu Romano, a brochure about Ancient Rome government. He returned to the Commonwealth in 1565, and was the first person to receive a commendation letter from the senate of the Republic of Venice.

=== Early career ===
After returning to Poland, he was appointed to the Royal Chancellery, and soon became a favorite secretary to King Sigismund II Augustus. In 1567 he commanded a royal task force, sent to remove the noble family of Starzechowscy from the royal lands they were decreed to hold illegally. Another major task he completed at that time was the reorganisation of the Chancellery archive.

In 1571, he married Anna Ossolińska; his wife and their young son died shortly afterwards, in 1572. After the extinction of the Jagiellon dynasty in 1572 during the election sejm (special session of the Commonwealth parliament) he used his influence to enforce the viritim election (meaning all nobles had the right to vote for the new king during the upcoming 1573 Polish–Lithuanian royal election). However, his proposal for majority voting did not pass, which opened the process for abuses of liberum veto in the future. He was a colleague of Mikołaj Sienicki and Hieronim Ossolinski, and with them he was one of the leaders of a faction of the lesser and middle nobility (szlachta) in the Commonwealth, whose goal was the reform the country – the execution movement – preserving the unique constitutional and parliamentary government of the Commonwealth with the dominant role of poorer nobility (Golden Freedom). He was so influential and popular among the lesser nobility that he was known as the "first tribune of nobility" or "Polish Gracchus."

=== Chancellor and Hetman ===
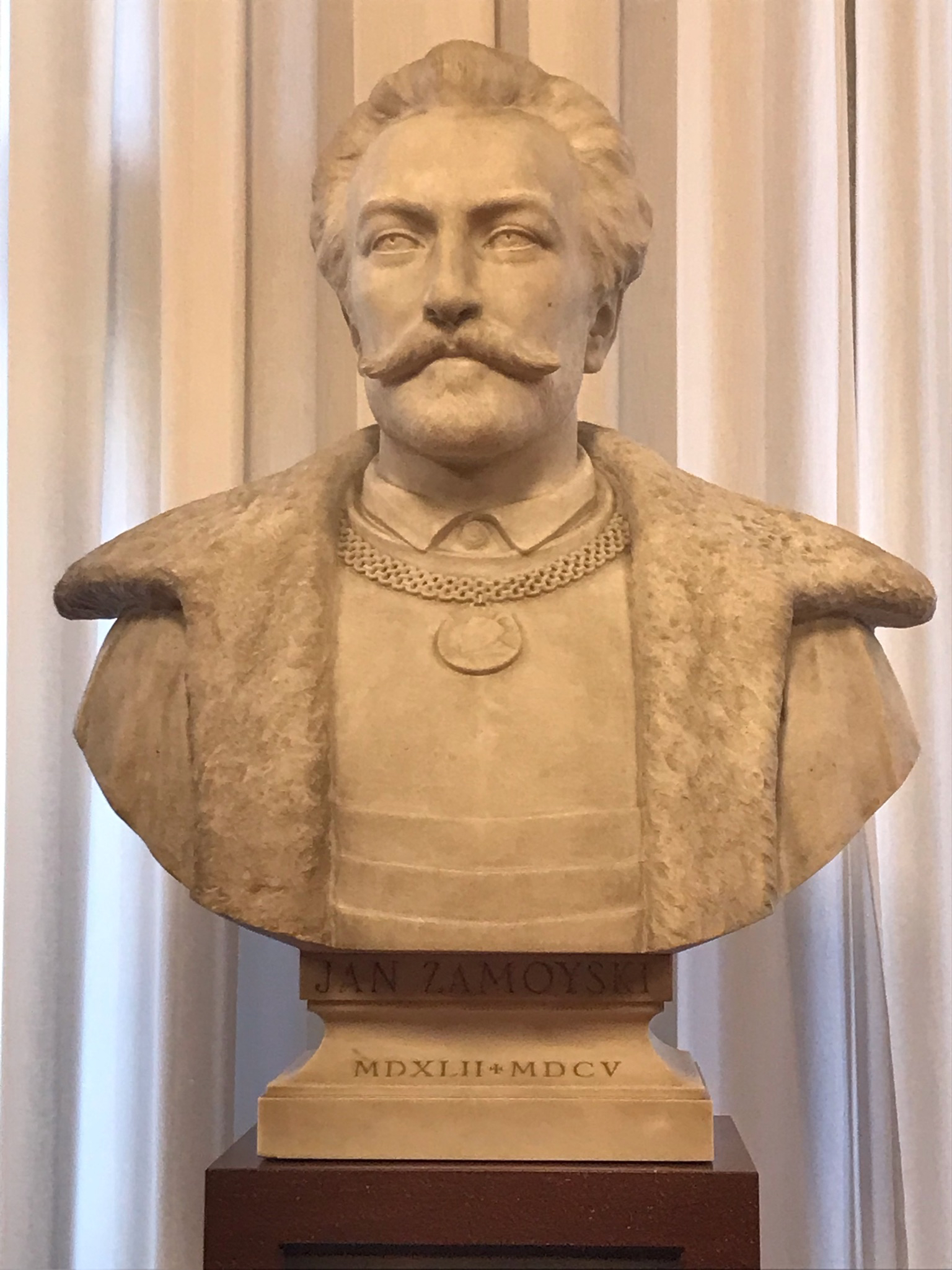
Bust of Zamoyski in the University of Padua, where he was a student and rector of the Universitas Iuristarum.

In that first election, he was in favour of Henry de Valois (later, Henry III of France). Subsequently, he was part of the diplomatic mission that traveled to France to finish formalities with the newly elected king. He also published a pamphlet praising the new king, and thus suffered a loss of face when Henry secretly abandoned Poland and returned to France. During the following 1575 election he was a vocal enemy of the Habsburg dynasty and its candidate, and this anti-Habsburg stance, resounding among the lesser nobility, helped him regain his popularity. For the king, Zamoyski championed the case of a Polish candidate, which ended up in the marriage of Anna Jagiellon with the anti-Habsburg Stephen Bathory of Transylvania.

Bathory thanked Zamoyski by granting him the office of Deputy Chancellor on 16 May 1576. He participated on Báthory's side in the quelling of the Danzig rebellion in 1576–1577, sponsoring a chorągiew of pancerni (cavalry unit) and participating in close combat on several occasions. In 1577 he married again, this time marrying Krystyna Radziwiłł, daughter of magnate Mikołaj Radziwiłł Czarny; this made him a close ally of the Radziwiłł family, the most powerful family in the Grand Duchy of Lithuania. In 1578 he received the post of the Grand Crown Chancellor. That year poet Jan Kochanowski dedicated his Odprawa Posłów Greckich, the first Polish tragedy, to him.

He took part in the preparation for a war against Muscovy in 1579–1581, where he contributed a group of 400 or 600 mercenaries. Although he had little prior military background or experience, he was interested in mastering the military art and proved to be an adept learner. With Báthory's support, he began filling in for some of the roles of Grand Crown Hetman Mikołaj Mielecki, particularly when Mielecki was not present. While not campaigning, he was also instrumental in ensuring that the ongoing political support for the war continued. In 1580, he was hit by another personal tragedy, as his wife died in labor, together with their child, entering a short period of depression.

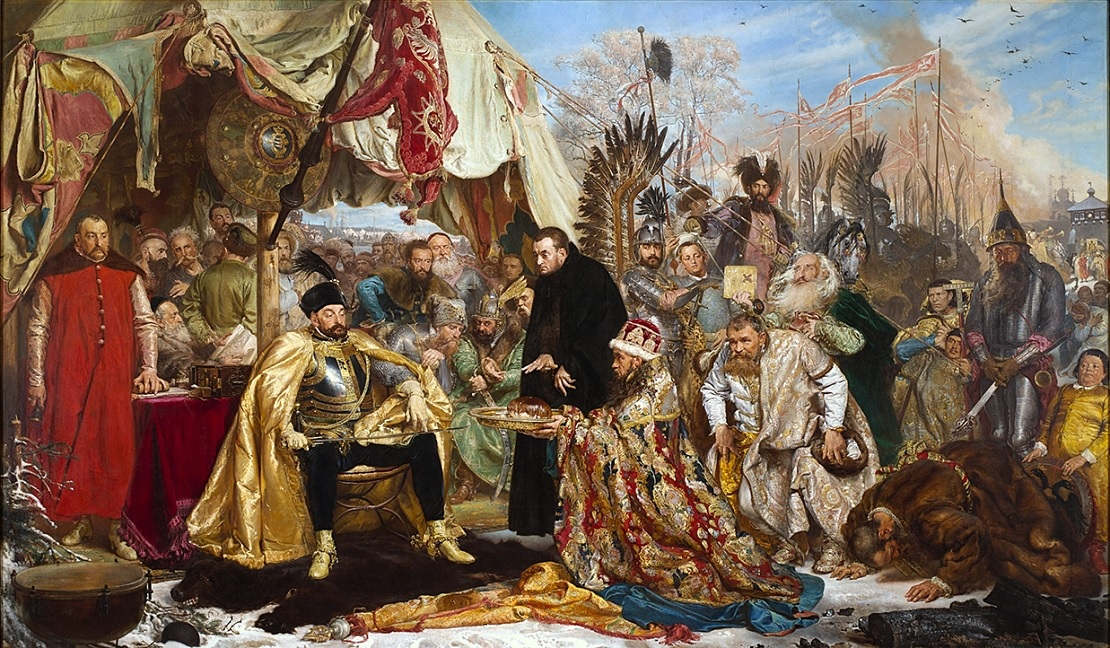
Zamoyski (in red) to the left of King Stephen Báthory at Pskov

Later that year, in August, he captured Velizh in September he participated in the siege of Velikiye Luki, and then took Zavoloc. On 11 August 1581 he received the nomination for the post of Grand Crown Hetman; this nomination, although uncontroversial at that time, was technically illegal. Following that he participated in the long and inconclusive Siege of Pskov, which ended with the Peace of Yam-Zapolsky in 1582. Though Zamoyski failed to capture Pskov, he drained the Russian resources, and the ongoing siege was a major reason for the final treaty, which was highly favorable to Poland.

In June 1583, Zamoyski took his third wife, Gryzelda Bathory, a relative of King Bathory himself. In May 1584, Zamoyski's men captured Samuel Zborowski, a noble whose death sentence for treason and murder had been pending for roughly a decade; shortly afterwards, with Báthory's consent, Zborowski was executed. This political conflict between Báthory, Zamoyski and the Zborowski family, framed as a clash between the monarch and the nobility, would be a major recurring controversy in internal Polish politics for many years, beginning with a major dispute at the Sejm of 1585.

=== Later years ===
After Báthory's death in 1586, Zamoyski helped Sigismund III Vasa gain the Polish throne, fighting in the brief civil war against the forces supporting Habsburg archduke Maximilian III of Austria. The camp supporting Sigismund was rallied around Zamoyski, whereas Maximilian was supported by the Zborowski family. Zamoyski defended Kraków and defeated Maximilian's forces in the Battle of Byczyna in 1588. In that battle, which Sławomir Leśniewski describes as "one of the most important in Polish history, and the most important in Zamoyski's military career", Maximilian was taken prisoner and in the resulting Treaty of Bytom and Będzin of 1589 had to give up all pretenses to the Polish crown. Later that year, Zamoyski proposed a reform of the royal elections, which failed to pass the Sejm. Zamoyski presented to this Sejm a project that, in case the present King should die without issue, none but a candidate of some Slav stock should henceforth be eligible to the Polish throne. This was a project that could even imagine the possibility of some kind of union between Catholic Poland, Orthodox Moscovy and semi-Protestant Bohemia. In fact, it was a circuitous and clumsy counter-proposal against pro-Habsburg policy.

From 1589, Zamoyski, in his role as the hetman, tried to prevent the intensifying Tatar incursions along the Commonwealth's south-eastern border, but with little success. In order to deal with the recurring disturbances in that region, Zamoyski developed a plan to turn Moldavia into a buffer zone between the Commonwealth and the Ottoman Empire; this would lead to a lengthy campaign.

=== In opposition to the throne ===
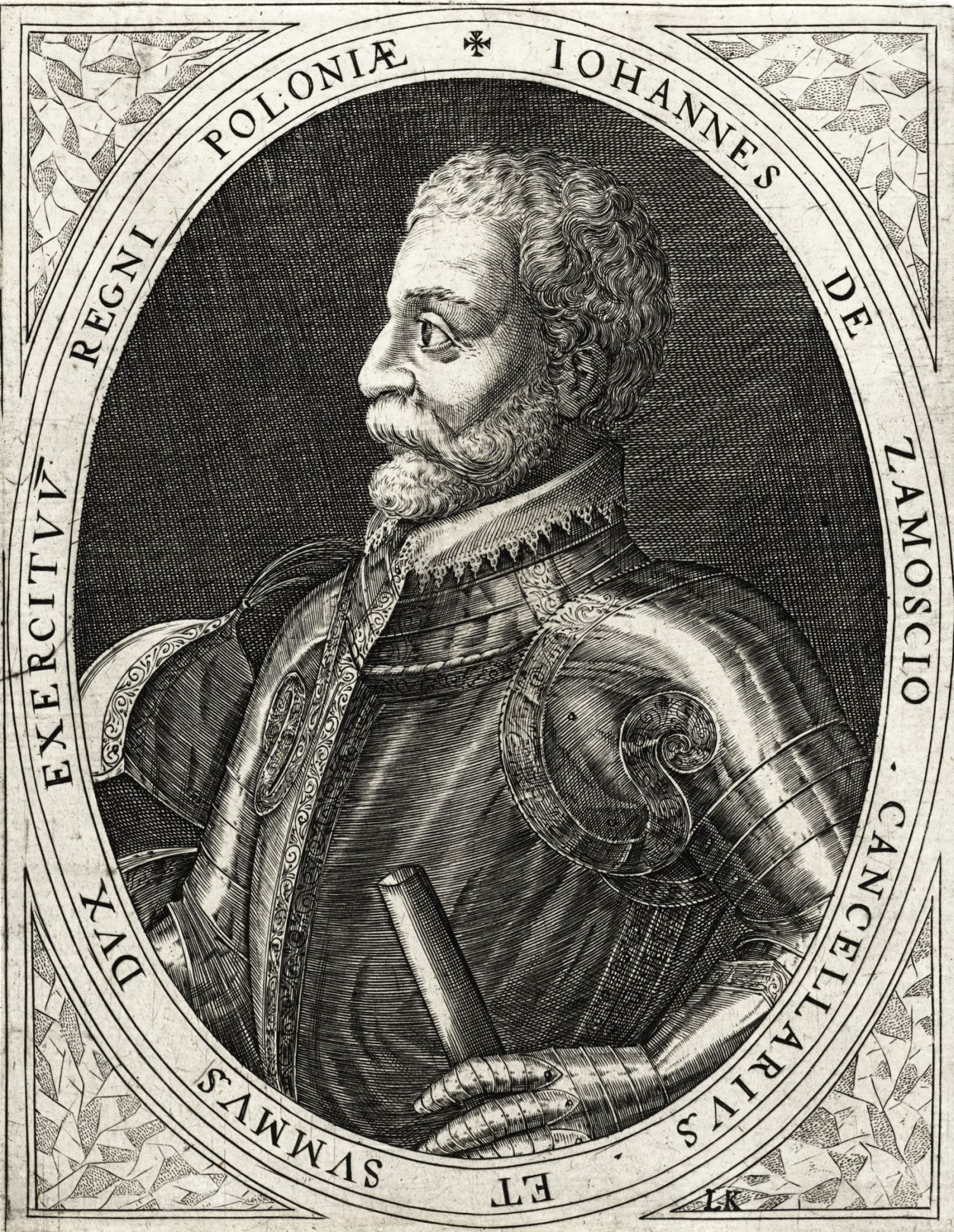
Jan Zamoyski, engraving by Dominicus Custos

Meanwhile, in internal Commonwealth politics, early on in Sigismund III's reign, Zamoyski, who was once a staunch supporter of the Commonwealth kings, began to distance himself from the King. Sigismund had quickly allied himself with the Habsburgs, much to chancellors dissatisfaction. Zamoyski was dissatisfied with Sigismund's early plans to use Poland as a stepping stone to gaining the Swedish crown, as Sigismund was plotting to cede the Polish crown to the Habsburgs in exchange for their support of his right to the Swedish throne. The new King feared the chancellor's power, but due to Commonwealth laws he was unable to dismiss him from his posts. He offered him a prestigious voivode of Kraków office, but Zamoyski declined, as if he was to accept, the law would require him to resign from his slightly less prestigious but more influential chancellorship. By 1590–1591, Zamoyski was seen as one of the king's staunchest opponents. An open quarrel between the king and chancellor broke out during the Sejm of 1591, culminating in a heated exchange of words and the king storming out of the chamber. Despite their tense relations, neither the king nor the chancellor wanted a civil war; soon after their quarrel, Zamoyski would issue a public apology to the king and their uneasy relationship would continue until Zamoyski's death. (Note: Some of Zamoyski's political allies were less restrained, and shortly after his death attempted to dehtrone Sigismund in the short-sighted civil war known as the Zebrzydowski's Rokosz (1606–1608).)

In 1594, Zamoyski once again failed to stop a Tatar incursion on the southern borders. The next year was much more successful, as in Moldavia in 1595 he was victorious in the Battle of Cecora, and helped hospodar Ieremia Movilă (Jeremi Mohyła) gain the throne. In 1600, he fought against Michael the Brave (Michał Waleczny, Mihai Viteazul), hospodar of Wallachia and the new Prince of Transylvania, who had conquered Moldavia a few months earlier. He defeated him at Bukova (Bucovu) and restored Ieremia to the throne. He also helped his brother, Simion Movilă, to become a brief ruler of Wallachia, thus spreading the influence of the Commonwealth to the Central Danube.

In 1600 and 1601 Zamoyski took part in the war against Sweden commanding the Commonwealth forces in Livonia (Inflanty). At the same time he was a vocal opponent of that war on the political scene. In 1600 he recaptured several strongholds from the Swedes and a year later captured Wolmar on 19 December 1601 Fellin on 16 May 1602, and Bialy Kamien on 30 September 1602. The rigours of the campaign, however, placed a strain on his health, and he resigned the command.

At the Sejm of 1603, Zamoyski led opposition to the governance reforms proposed by Sigismund, seeing in them intentions of transforming the Commonwealth into an absolute monarchy. Later, he also opposed Sigismund's plans to intervene in the civil war plaguing Muscovy (the Time of Troubles and the Dymitriads). He clashed with Sigismund for the final time during the Sejm of January 1605.

Zamoyski died suddenly on 3 June 1605, due to a stroke. His fortune was inherited by his single son, Tomasz Zamoyski.

== Assessment and legacy ==
=== Remembrance ===
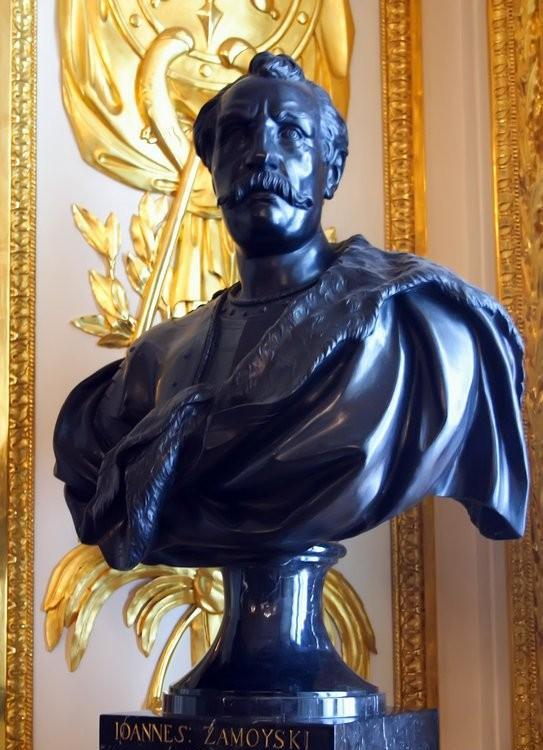
Bust Zamoyski at the Royal Castle in Warsaw

The fame of Zamoyski, his significance in life, endured after his death. He was praised by artists such as Szymon Starowolski and Julian Ursyn Niemcewicz, and historians, including Stanisław Staszic, Stanisław Tarnowski and Artur Śliwiński. There were also those critical of him: Hugo Kołłątaj, Józef Szujski, Michał Bobrzyński. Nonetheless, Polish historiography and culture treatment of Zamoyski is mostly positive, and historian Janusz Tazbir remarked that Zamoyski's posthumous career was even more magnificent than his real one. Leśniewski, ending his recent biography of Zamoyski, concludes that he is a significant, if controversial, figure of Polish Renaissance.

Zamoyski was the subject of several paintings and drawings. Most notably, he is one of the characters in two large paintings by Jan Matejko, featured on the Skarga's Sermon and Batory at Pskov.

=== Political and military leader ===
Having control of both the Chancellorship and the Grand Hetman office, Zamoyski was one of the most powerful people in the country, having obtained both the power of Grand Hetman (commander in chief of the armed forces) and that of chancellor, combined for the first time in the hands of one person. He was responsible for much of the Polish internal and foreign policies. He is considered to be one of the most prominent statesmen in Polish history.

Even though his military career began almost as an afterthought, or by accident, Zamoyski is also remembered as one of the most accomplished Polish military commanders. In his tactics, he favored sieges, flanking maneuvers, conserving his forces, and the new Western art of fortification and artillery. The war with Muscovy shown him to be a skilled commander in sieges, and latter events would prove him to be an equally able leader in the open field.

=== Wealth and cultural patronage ===
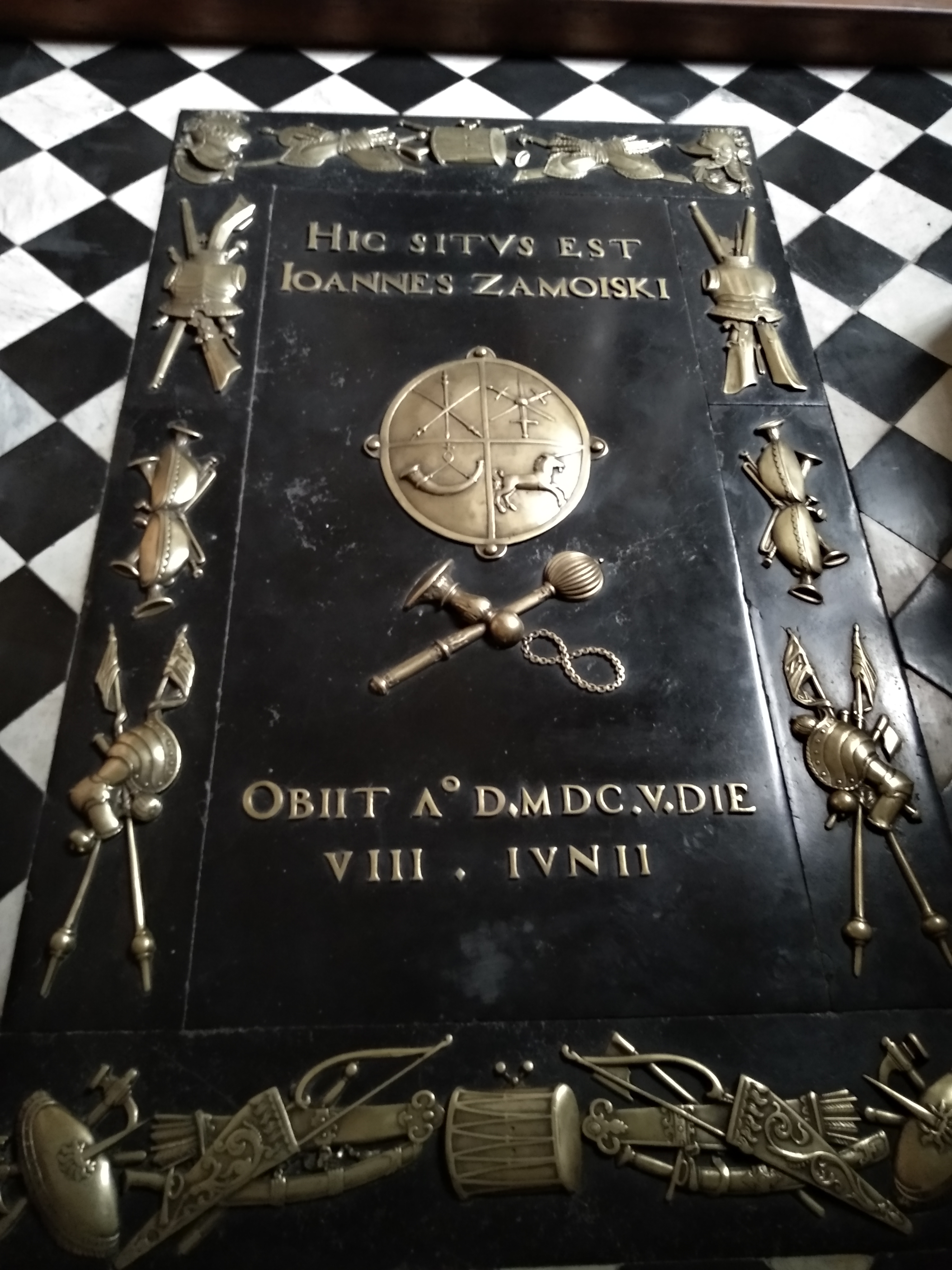
Zamoyski's tomb inside the Cathedral of the Resurrection, Zamość

Zamoyski gathered a significant fortune; his estates generated a revenue of over 200,000 zlotys in the early 17th century. His personal lands covered 6,445 square kilometres (2,488 sq mi), and included eleven towns and over 200 villages. He was a royal caretaker of another dozen or so cities and over 600 villages. Totaled, his personal and leased lands covered over 17,000 square kilometres (6,600 sq mi), with 23 towns and cities and 816 villages. In 1589 he succeeded in establishing the Zamoyski Family Fee Tail (ordynacja zamojska), a de facto duchy. Zamoyski supported economical development of his lands, investing in colonisation of frontiers, and the development of industry, both small (sawmills, breweries, mills and such) and large (his lands had four iron mills and four glass factories).

His most prized creation was the capital of his Fee Tail, the city of Zamość, founded in 1580, built and designed as a Renaissance citta ideale or "ideal city" by the Italian architect Bernardo Morando. In the city, in 1595 he founded the Akademia Zamojska, the third university in the history of education in Poland. In addition to Zamość, he also funded four other towns: Szarogród, Skinderpol, Busza and Jasnogród.

Zamoyski collected a significant library and was a patron of numerous artists in his fiefdom. Artists under his patronage included the poets Jan Kochanowski and Szymon Szymonowic, and the writer and historian Joachim Bielski.

=== Personality ===
Zamoyski was not a deeply religious person, and his conversion from Protestantism to Catholicism was primarily pragmatic. Leśniewski notes that Zamoyski was often motivated by greed, for example during the Danzig Rebellion, when he supported lenient treatment of the rebels, and during the 1577–1578 negotiations with, when he favored the solution of George Frederick, Margrave of Brandenburg-Ansbach; in both cases his decision was likely influenced by bribes or favors. In another example, Leśniewski describes how Zamoyski openly demanded rewards following his victory at Byczyna, and tried to include an article favoring him in the Bytom and Będzin treaty. He further notes, critically, that with raising power and political success Zamoyski begun displaying negative qualities, such as egoism and arrogance. Zamoyski was ruthless to those weaker than him. At the same time, he was respected by his opponents, widely recognised as highly intelligent, a cunning strategist and tactician in matters political and military, and a popular political leader. He valued the good of the country at least as high as his own, and although he could have become the king after a victorious civil war against Sigismund, he preferred to act within the limits of law instead, avoiding a war that could devastate the country, and thus curbing his own ambitions.

== See also ==
- Army of the Polish–Lithuanian Commonwealth
