= Maximilian III of Austria =

Maximilian III
- Grand Master of the Teutonic Order
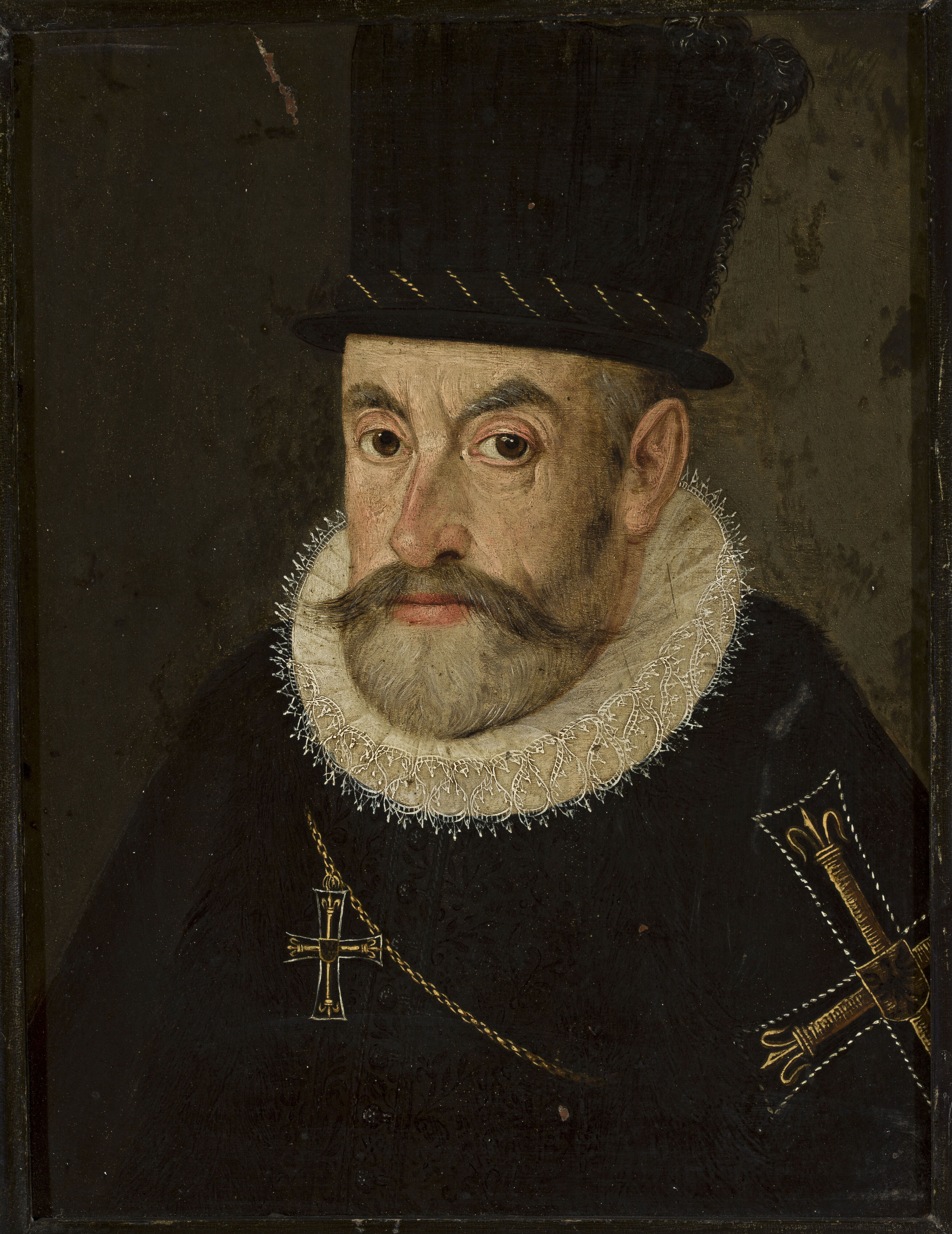
- Portrait by Hans Henseiller, 1590s, National Museum in Warsaw

Archduke of Further Austria
- Reign: 26 June 1612 – 2 November 1618
- Predecessor: Matthias
- Successor: Matthias

King of Poland Grand Duke of Lithuania (contested)
- Reign: 27 September 1587 – 9 March 1589
- Predecessor: Stephen Báthory
- Successor: Sigismund III Vasa
- Born: 12 October 1558; Wiener Neustadt, Archduchy of Austria
- Died: 2 November 1618 (aged 60); Vienna, Archduchy of Austria
- Burial: Innsbruck Cathedral
- House: Habsburg
- Father: Maximilian II, Holy Roman Emperor
- Mother: Maria of Spain
- Religion: Roman Catholicism
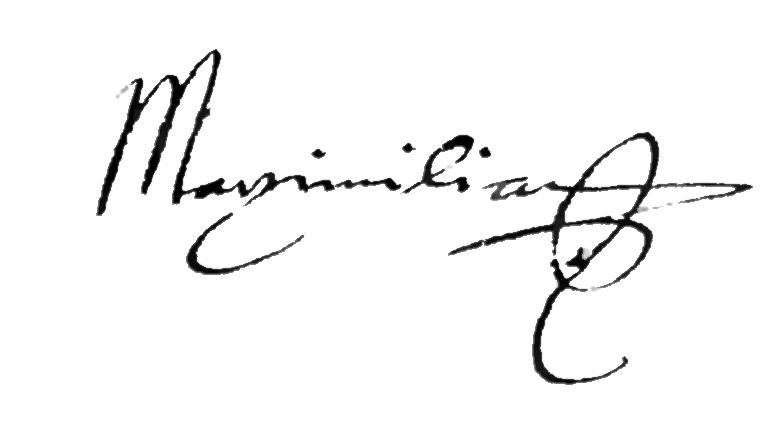
- Signature

Maximilian III of Austria (12 October 1558 – 2 November 1618), was a member of the House of Habsburg and the Archduke of Further Austria from 1612 until his death. He was also briefly known as Maximilian of Poland during his claim for the Polish throne. After trying and failing to be elected as King of Poland, he launched the War of the Polish Succession and was defeated by the winner, Sigismund III Vasa. He was also Grand Master of the Teutonic Order.

== Biography ==
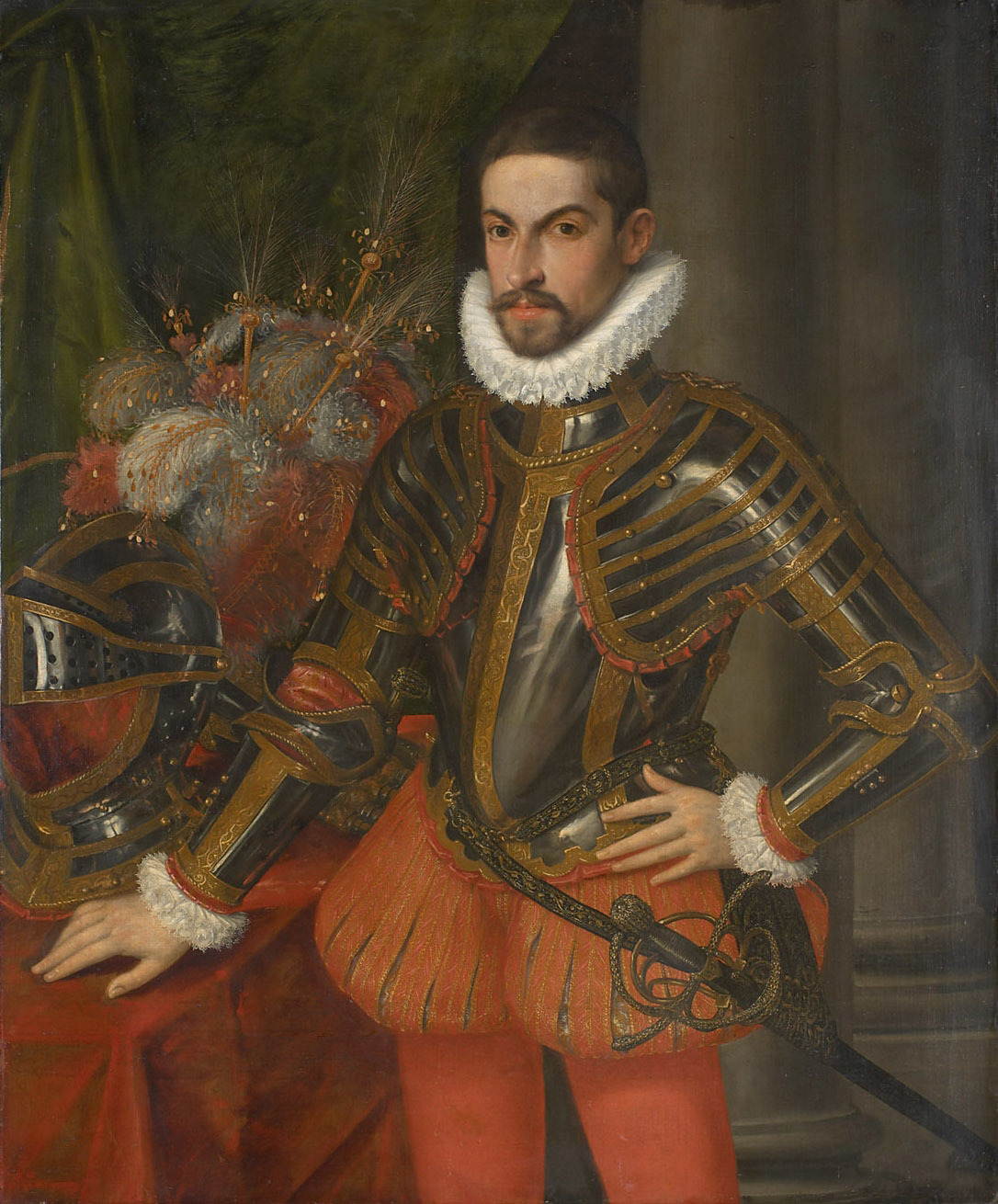
Portrait of Archduke Maximilian by Martino Rota, c. 1580

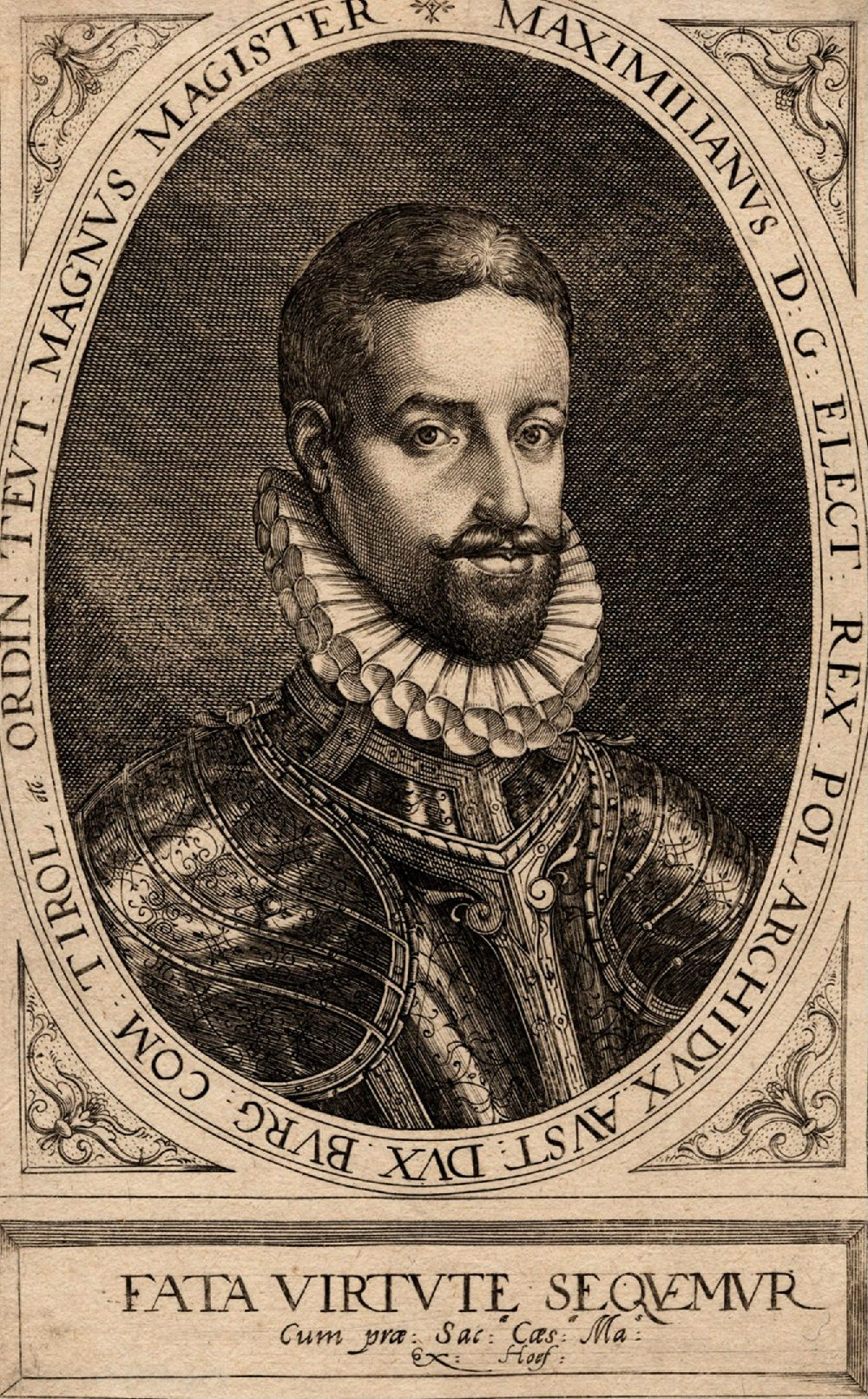
Anonymous Netherlands, Portrait of Maximilian, Archduke of Austria, 17th century, engraving

Born in Wiener Neustadt, Maximilian was the fourth son of the Emperor Maximilian II and Maria of Spain. He was a grandson of Anna of Bohemia and Hungary, daughter and heiress of Vladislaus II of Bohemia and Hungary, who himself was the eldest son of Casimir IV of Poland from the Jagiellonian dynasty.

In 1585, Maximilian became the Grand Master of the Teutonic Order; thanks to this he was known by the epithet der Deutschmeister ("the German Master") for much of his later life.

In the 1587 Polish–Lithuanian royal election Maximilian stood as a candidate for the throne of the Polish–Lithuanian Commonwealth, following the death of the previous king, Stephen Báthory. A portion of the Polish nobility supported Maximilian, but the larger faction elected Prince Sigismund of Sweden, grandson of Sigismund I the Old, as Sigismund III Vasa. Maximilian then invaded Poland, starting the War of the Polish Succession (1587–1588). He had considerable support in Poland, but fewer Poles flocked to his army than to that of his rival. In late 1587, he tried and failed to storm Kraków. At Pitschen in Silesia, he met Sigismund's army, commanded by Polish hetman Jan Zamojski. In the Battle of Byczyna (24 January 1588), Maximilian was defeated and captured. He was released a year and half later after the intervention of Pope Sixtus V in the aftermath of the Treaty of Bytom and Będzin. In 1598, he formally renounced his claim to the Polish crown. The inactivity of his brother, Emperor Rudolf II, in this matter contributed to Rudolf's poor reputation.

From 1593 to 1595, Maximilian served as regent for his young cousin, the future Emperor Ferdinand II as Archduke of Inner Austria. In 1595, Maximilian succeeded to the territories of their uncle Ferdinand II, Archduke of Further Austria, including Tyrol, where he proved to be a solid proponent of the Counter-Reformation. He also worked to depose Melchior Khlesl, and to ensure that Ferdinand succeeded as Holy Roman Emperor.

Today, Maximilian is perhaps best remembered for his baroque archducal hat, exhibited in the treasury of the monastery of Klosterneuburg and used for ceremonial purposes as late as 1835.

He died at Vienna in 1618, and is buried in the canopied tomb in Innsbruck Cathedral.

== Ancestors ==
Ancestors of Maximilian III of Austria

8. Philip I of Castile
4. Ferdinand I, Holy Roman Emperor
9. Joanna I of Castile
2. Maximilian II, Holy Roman Emperor
10. Vladislas II of Bohemia and Hungary
5. Anne of Bohemia and Hungary
11. Anne of Foix-Candale
1. Maximilian III, Archduke of Austria
12. Philip I of Castile (= 8)
6. Charles V, Holy Roman Emperor
13. Joanna I of Castile (= 9)
3. Maria of Austria
14. Manuel I of Portugal
7. Isabella of Portugal
15. Maria of Aragon

== Male-line family tree ==
House of Habsburg

Original line
Albert; Count of Habsburg c. 1188–1239
Rudolf I of Germany c. 1218–1291
Albert I of Germany; 1255–1308	Hartmann; 1263–1281	Rudolf II; Duke of Austria; 1270–1290
Rudolf I of Bohemia; 1281–1307	Frederick the Fair c. 1289–1330	Leopold I Duke of Austria; 1290–1326	Albert II; Duke of Austria; 1298–1358	Henry the Friendly; 1299–1327	Otto; Duke of Austria; 1301–1339	John; Parricida c. 1290–1312/1313
Albertinian line	Leopoldian line
Rudolf IV; Duke of Austria; 1339–1365	Frederick III; 1347–1362	Albert III; Duke of Austria; 1349–1395	Leopold III; Duke of Austria; 1351–1386	Frederick II; Duke of Austria; 1327–1344	Leopold II; Duke of Austria; 1328–1344
Albert IV; Duke of Austria; 1377–1404	William; Duke of Austria c. 1370–1406	Leopold IV; Duke of Austria; 1371–1411	Ernest; Duke of Austria; 1377–1424	Frederick IV; Duke of Austria; 1382–1439
Albert II of Germany; 1397–1439	Frederick III; HRE; 1415–1493	Albert VI; Archduke of Austria; 1418–1463	Sigismund; Archduke of Austria; 1427–1496
Ladislaus the Posthumous; 1440–1457	Maximilian I HRE; 1459–1519
Philip I of Castile; 1478–1506
Spanish / Iberian line	Austrian / HRE line
Charles V HRE; 1500–1558	Ferdinand I HRE; 1503–1564
Philip II of Spain; 1527–1598	Maximilian II; HRE; 1527–1576	Ferdinand II; Archduke of Austria; 1529–1595	Charles II; Archduke of Austria; 1540–1590
Carlos; Prince of Asturias; 1545–1568	Philip III of Spain; 1578–1621	Rudolf II; HRE; 1552–1612	Ernest of Austria; 1553–1595	Matthias; HRE; 1557–1619	Maximilian III; Archduke of Austria; 1558–1618	Albert VII; Archduke of Austria; 1559–1621	Wenceslaus; Archduke of Austria; 1561–1578	Andrew; Margrave of Burgau; 1558–1600	Charles; Margrave of Burgau; 1560–1618	Ferdinand II; HRE; 1578–1637	Maximilian Ernest of Austria; 1583–1616	Leopold V Archduke of Austria; 1586–1632	Charles of Austria; 1590–1624
Philip IV of Spain; 1605–1665	Charles of Austria; 1607–1632	Ferdinand of Austria; 1609–1641	John-Charles of Austria; 1605–1619	Ferdinand III; HRE; 1608–1657	Leopold Wilhelm of Austria; 1614–1662	Ferdinand Charles; Archduke of Austria; 1628–1662	Sigismund Francis; Archduke of Austria; 1630–1665
Balthasar Charles; Prince of Asturias; 1629–1646	Charles II of Spain; 1661–1700	Ferdinand IV; King of the Romans; 1633–1654	Leopold I HRE; 1640–1705	Charles Joseph of Austria; 1649–1664
Joseph I HRE; 1678–1711	Charles VI; HRE; 1685–1740
Lorraine
Maria Theresa; HRE; 1740–1780	Francis I HRE; 1745–1765
Habsburg-Lorraine
Joseph II; HRE; 1765–1790	Leopold II; HRE; 1790–1792
Francis II; HRE; 1792–1806

Notes:

Preceded by Ferdinand II, Archduke of Further Austria; Archduke Mathias, his elder brother	Governor of Tirol; Archduke of Further Austria; 1612–1618	Succeeded by Leopold V, Archduke of Further Austria, his first cousin
Preceded by Charles II, Archduke of Inner Austria	Regent of Styria; 1593–1595	Succeeded by Ferdinand III, Archduke of Inner Austria
Preceded by Heinrich von Bobenhausen	Grand Master of the Teutonic Order; 1590–1618	Succeeded by Archduke Charles III of Austria
