= Stanisław Karnkowski =

Polish bishop

His Excellency Stanisław Karnkowski
- Archbishop of Gniezno; Primate of Poland
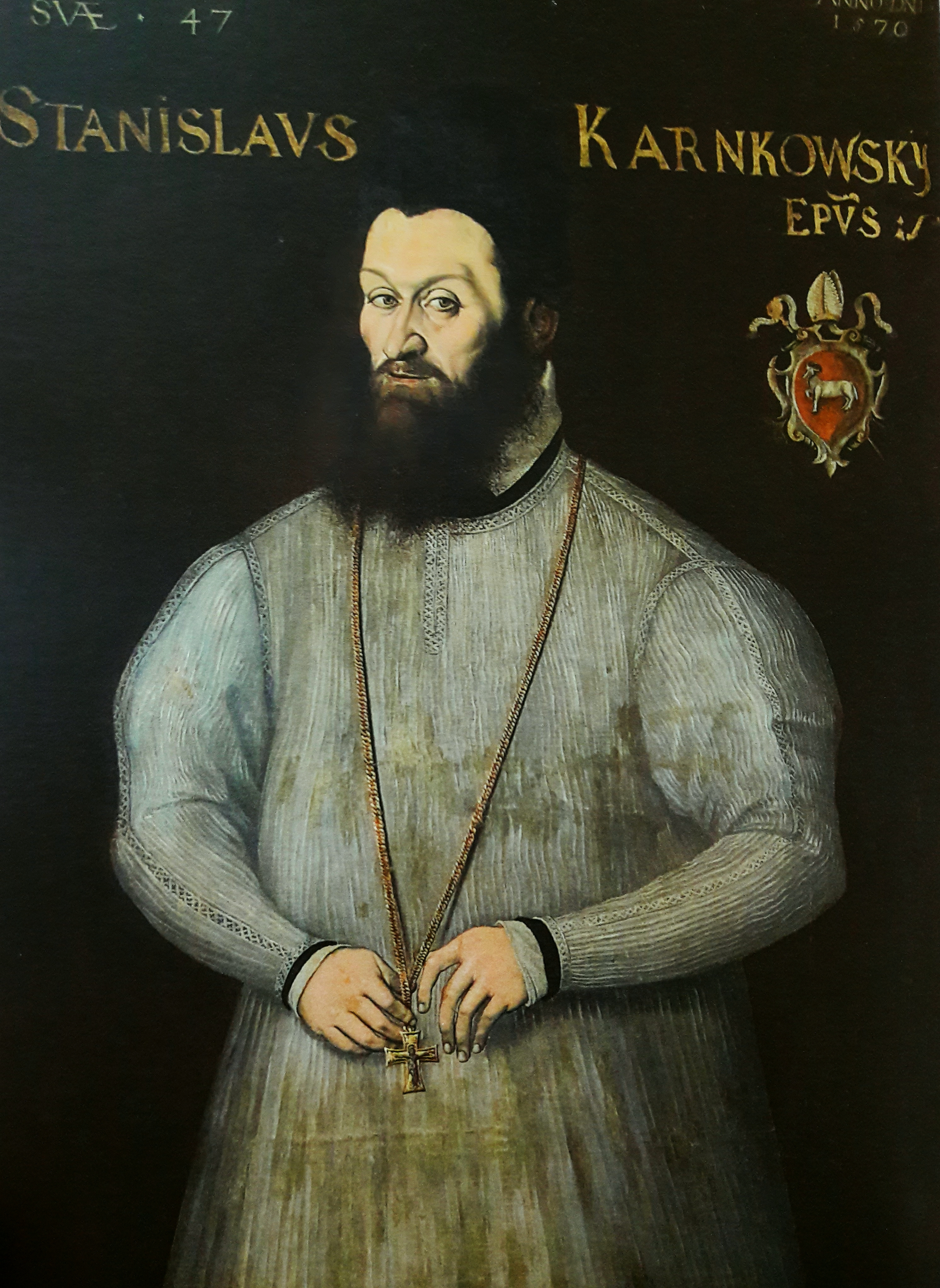
- Diocese: Roman Catholic Archdiocese of Gniezno
- See: Archdiocese of Gniezno

Personal details
- Born: 1520 Karnkowo, Poland
- Died: 1603 (aged 82–83) Łowicz, Poland
- Denomination: Roman Catholic

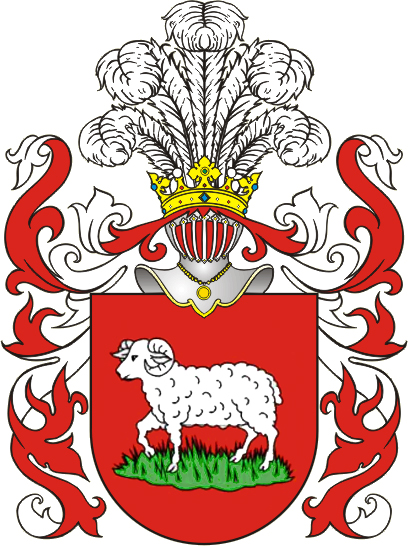
Junosza

Stanisław Karnkowski of Junosza (1520–1603) was the Great Referendary of the Polish Crown (since 1558), the Great Secretary of Poland (since 1563), bishop of Włocławek (1567-1580) as well as archbishop of Gniezno and Primate of Poland (since 1581). He served during the Interrex in 1586–1587, before the coronation of Sigismund III Vasa.

Karnkowski chaired the Sejm commission which prepared the so-called "Karnkowski's Statutes" approved by the Parliament in 1570. He was the only bishop on the election sejm to vote for Stefan Batory, who was suspected of being a secret Protestant. He opposed attempts of reforming the way of the election made by Jan Zamoyski and proposals of raising up taxes for the army.

Stanisław Karnkowski invited Jesuits to Kalisz and Poznań and founded the buildings that had to serve as centres of the struggle against Protestants in Greater Poland. Due to these activities, he was strongly supported by the king Sigismund III Vasa, the Jesuit complex was erected (1586–1597).

Stanisław Karnkowski is one of the personas on the famous painting by Jan Matejko: the Sermon of Piotr Skarga.

Catholic Church titles
Preceded by Jakub Uchański	Primate of Poland; Archbishop of Gniezno; 1581–1603	Succeeded by Jan Tarnowski
