= Zborowski =

Zborowski (feminine Zborowska, plural Zborowscy) is a Polish surname. Notable people with the surname include:

- Andriy Zborovskyi (born 1986), Ukrainian footballer
- Eliot Zborowski (1858–1903), American racing driver
- Helmut Zborowski (1905–1969), Austrian aircraft designer
- Jan Zborowski (1538–1603), Polish Court Hetman
- Jerzy Zborowski (1922–1944), Polish resistance fighter
- Krzysztof Zborowski (died 1593), Polish Royal Deputy cup-bearer
- Leopold Zborowski (1889–1932), Polish poet
- Louis Zborowski (1895–1924), English racing driver
- Marcin Zborowski (c. 1495–1565), Polish castellan
- Mark Zborowski (1908–1990), Soviet-Jewish KGB agent
- Piotr Zborowski (died 1580), Polish voivode
- Samuel Zborowski (died 1584), Polish noble, famous for his execution
- Wiktor Zborowski (born 1951), Polish actor
