= Jan Willenberg =

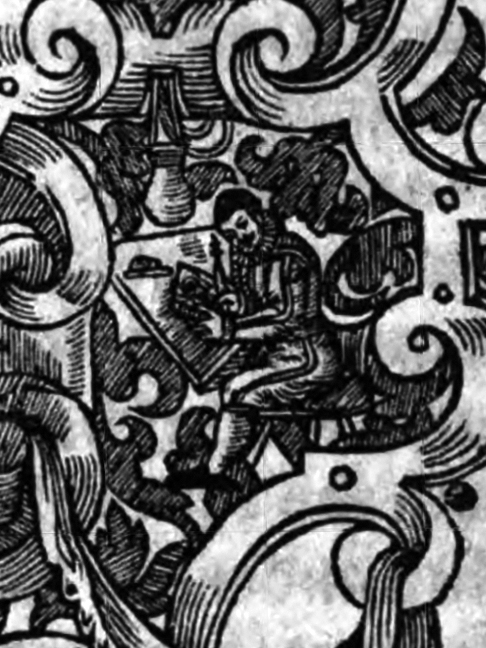
- Supposed self-portrait of Jan Willenberg
- Born: 23 June 1571; Trzebnica
- Died: 3 October 1613 (aged 42); Prague
- Known for: woodcuts, prints, drawings
- Style: late Renaissance

Jan Willenberg (23 June 1571 – 3 October 1613) was a late-renaissance author of woodcuts, prints and drawings active in Moravia and Bohemia. He is best known for his book illustrations and vedute of several cities in Bohemia, Moravia, Silesia, Slovakia and Austria. Willenberg is one of a few known printmakers of the turn of the 16th and 17th centuries, whose name and work are known.

== Life ==
Jan Willenberg (also known as Johann or Joannes Willengerger or Villenperger) was born in 1571 in Silesian Trzebnica to German speaking gardener Thomas Willenberg (?–1584). He soon moved with his family to Moravian Přerov. After 1582 he was in training in the print-shop of Friedrich Milichthaler in Olomouc and probably also in Nuremberg from where he returned after 1585. In 1595–1600, he worked for the print-shop of Premonstratensian Louka Monastery. Around 1600 Willenberg moved to Prague where he remained until his death in 1613, but he left city several times. Between 1600 and 1602 he travelled and prepared sketches of cities, in 1610 he went to Přerov and continued to Olomouc, Nysa and Wrocław and returned to Prague. Jan was married and had a daughter Ludmila. In Prague, Willenberg worked in print-shops of Daniel Sedlčanský, Johann Schumann, Georgius Nigrinus, Daniel Adam z Veleslavína and Samuel Adam z Veleslavína. His health was subdued by excessive alcohol consumption, to which he confesses in his diary note from 1611. Jan Willenberg wrote his last note to the diary on 3 October, which is assumed as the day of his death.

=== Personal diary ===
Willenberger kept a diary during his life by taking notes into print of Book of Psalms, most likely published in 1586 in Strasbourg. He inserted several of his prints into the book and recorded various events, travel experiences, family events, poems and other notes in German and Czech. Willenberger's diary was a unique source of information about the artist's life and several historians researched it since the early 20th century, but the diary got lost after the death of his last possessor Florian Zapletal in 1969, and most likely subsequently destroyed with other archival papers from his inheritance.

=== Confession ===
Willenberg's confession was the subject of discussion. He came from a catholic family, some of his diary notes supported his Protestant confession, but since he worked in the Louka monastery, he had to be a catholic. After moving to Prague he most likely converted back to Catholicism.

== Artwork ==
Willenberg most likely created already in 1590's several unsigned vedute and portraits in Milichthaler's print-shop for Zrcadlo slavného Margkrabství moravského (Olomouc 1593) by Bartosz Paprocki. Willenberg personally visited depicted cities like Brno or Olomouc and made sketches for woodcuts. After this commission, Willenberg made a woodcut for prints of graduation theses of Olomouc university from 1597 and 1598, printed in the shop of Georg Handl. This print depicts the IHS monogram, a crest of bishop Stanislav Pavlovský and Saint Wenceslaus, Catherine of Alexandria, Saint Stanislaus and Ursula.

During his employment in Louka monastery at least six publications contained his woodcut illustrations with monogram signature JW. Willenberg made a woodcuts of investiture of Saint Norbert, abbot's coat of arms and Saint Wenceslaus with small veduta of Louka church in Agendarium sive Ordo rituum et ceremoniarum ... cand. Praemonst. Ord. (Louka 1595) by Sebastian II. von Baden, woodcut of soldier in front of Wien in Geistliche Kriegszrüstung wider den gemeinen blutdurstigen Tyrannen … den Türken (Louka 1595) also by Sebastian II. von Baden, monastic scenes, cycle of saints and several motives from New Testament in Breviarium juxta ritum candidisimi Ordinis praemonstratensis (Louka 1597), moravian coat of arms in Artikule sněmovní (Louka 1600), religious pictures in Postill … uber die sontäglichen Euangelia durch das gantze Jahr (Louka 1603 and 1605) by Georg Scherer and illustrations in Praemonstratensis ordinis nonnullorum patrum vitae (Louka 1608) by Sigismundus Kohel. Willenberger most likely portraited himself as xylographer in vignette of Schrerer's Postill. Willenberg travelled from Louka to Wien and as far as Zvolen and Banská Bystrica which he also sketched.

In the subsequent period in Bohemia, during travels Willenberg captured several pen sketches of cities without any staffage and transformed them to fifteen simplified woodcuts for Diadochos, id est Successio jinák Posloupnost knížat a králův českých (Praha 1602) by Paprocki. Another vedute of cities and castles were incorporated to twelve allegories of urban and rural life published in Kalendář Nowý s Pranostykau Hwězdářskau (most likely Prague 1603) by Kašpar Ladislav Stehlík. An extensive series of 47 illustrations by Willenberg were published in travelbook Putování aneb Cesta z Království českého do města Benátek, odtud po moři do Země svaté, Země judské a dále do Egypta a velikého města Kairu (Prague 1608) by Kryštof Harant, including depictions of contemporary foreign costumes, architecture, fauna, flora and also map of Mediterranean sea and views of Jerusalem, Alexandria, Cairo or mount Sinai could be attributed to him. Woodcuts were made probably after Harant's own sketches, even though there is no proof, this is likely because the ability to draw was part of the education of a nobleman.

Willenberg also made a picture of siege in Feldleger des durchleüchtigsten Fürsten und Hern Hern Matthya, … ein Meil von Prag, … wie es aigentlich zusehn gewesen ist (Prague 1608) and very likely illustrations in publications by Georgius Nigrinus.

A frequent theme of Willenberg's woodcuts from the Prague period were also portraits, crests and coats of arms. He did a portrait of Rudolf II. with lion and other crests in Artikule sněmovní (Prague 1610), crest of printmaker Samuel Adam in Bible česká (Prague 1613), portrait of Matthias II. in Korunování Jeho Milosti Matyáše … na Království české (Prague 1611) and other publications by Jiří Závěta ze Závětic. Religious motives are as well part of Willenberg's work, for example picture of King David kneeling at altar in Vojenská ouprava krále Davida aneb Žalmové (Prague 1604), picture of angel and devil beating a seated person in Pokuty a trestání přestupníkův Božích přikázání (Prague 1613) by Matěj Poličanský or crucifixion in Svatej svatého divy a zázraky schváleného obcování život Ignácia Lojoly (Prague 1617) by Pedro de Ribadeneira.

=== Gallery ===
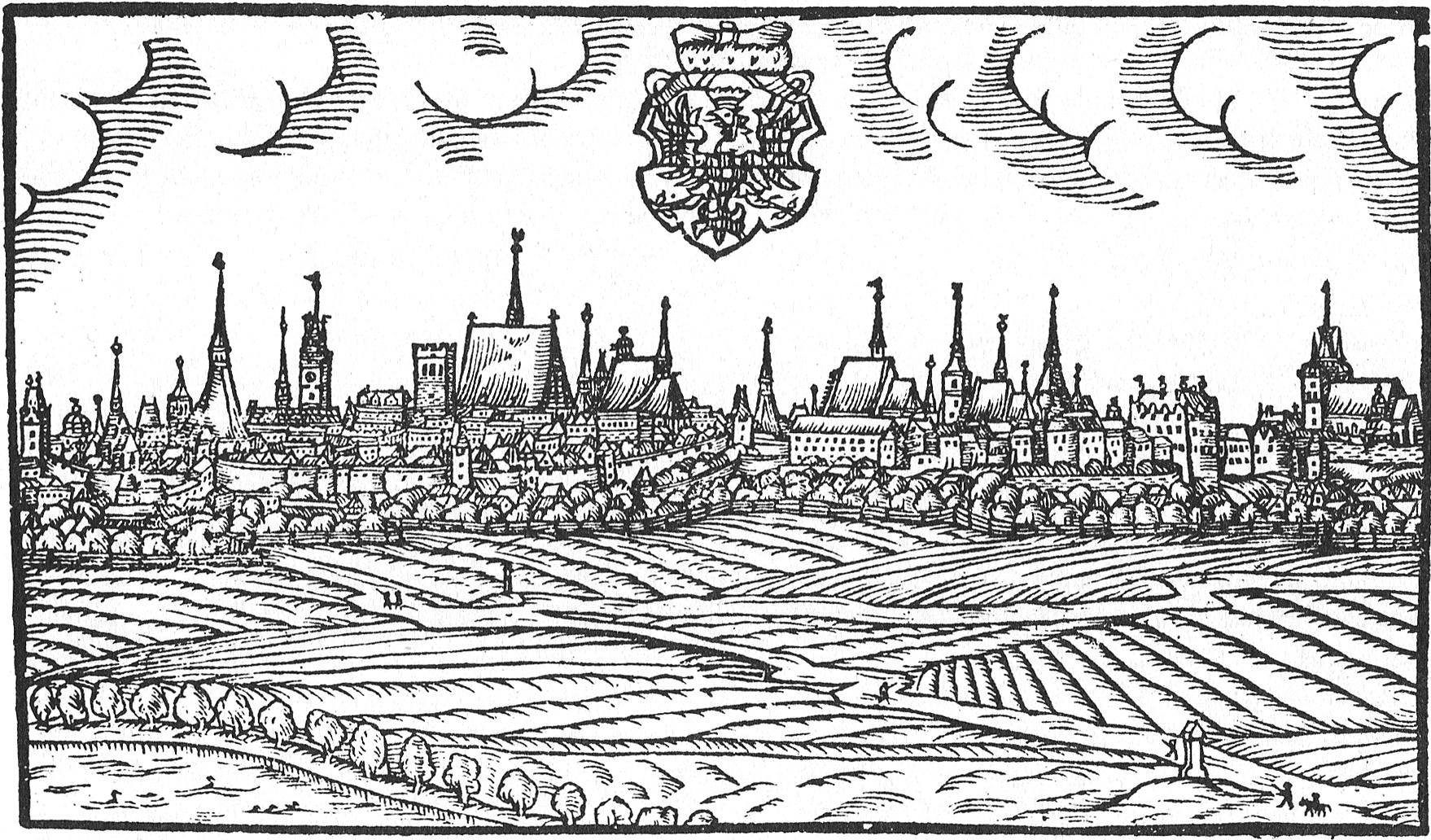
Veduta of Olomouc, 1593 for book Zrcadlo

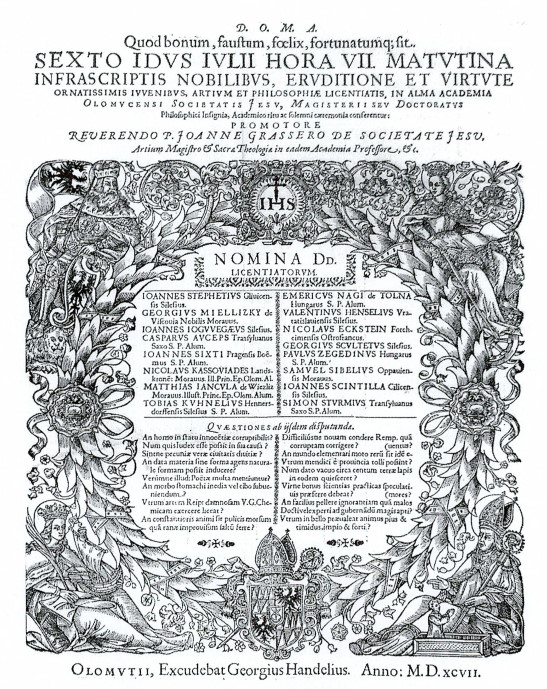
Graduation thesis of the Olomouc University, 1597

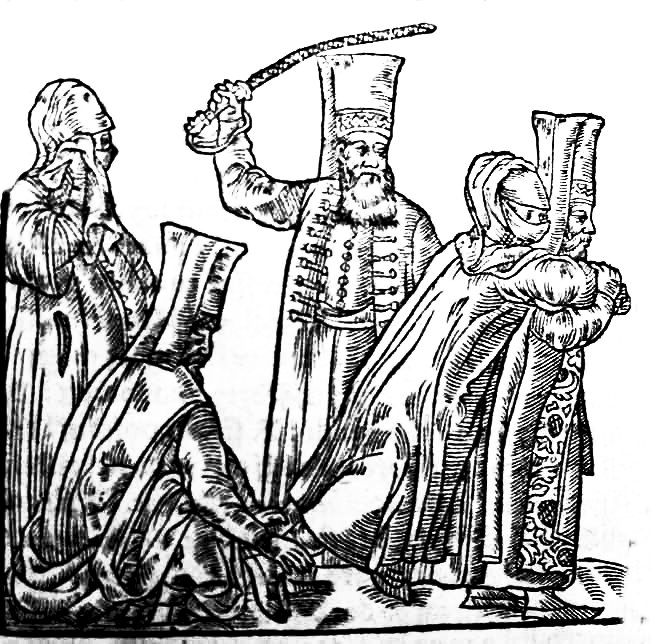
Figůra jakým způsobem trestá ženu, která se krádeže dopustila for book Putování (1608) by Kryštof Harant

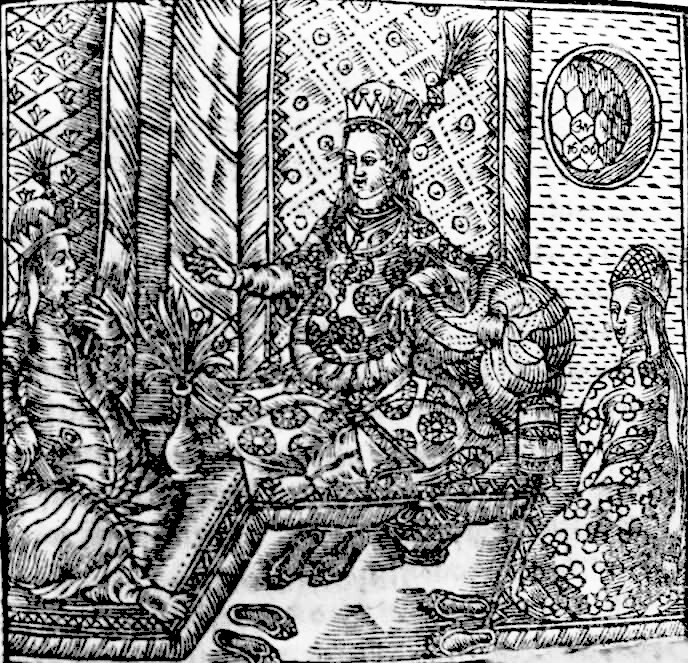
Figůra krásně ozdobených žen sedících na zemi for book Putování

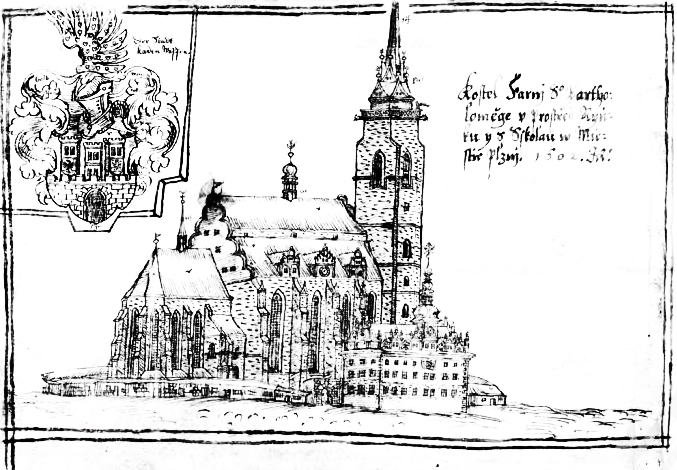
Church of saint Bartholomeus in Plzeň, 1602, ink drawing for veduta of Plzeň

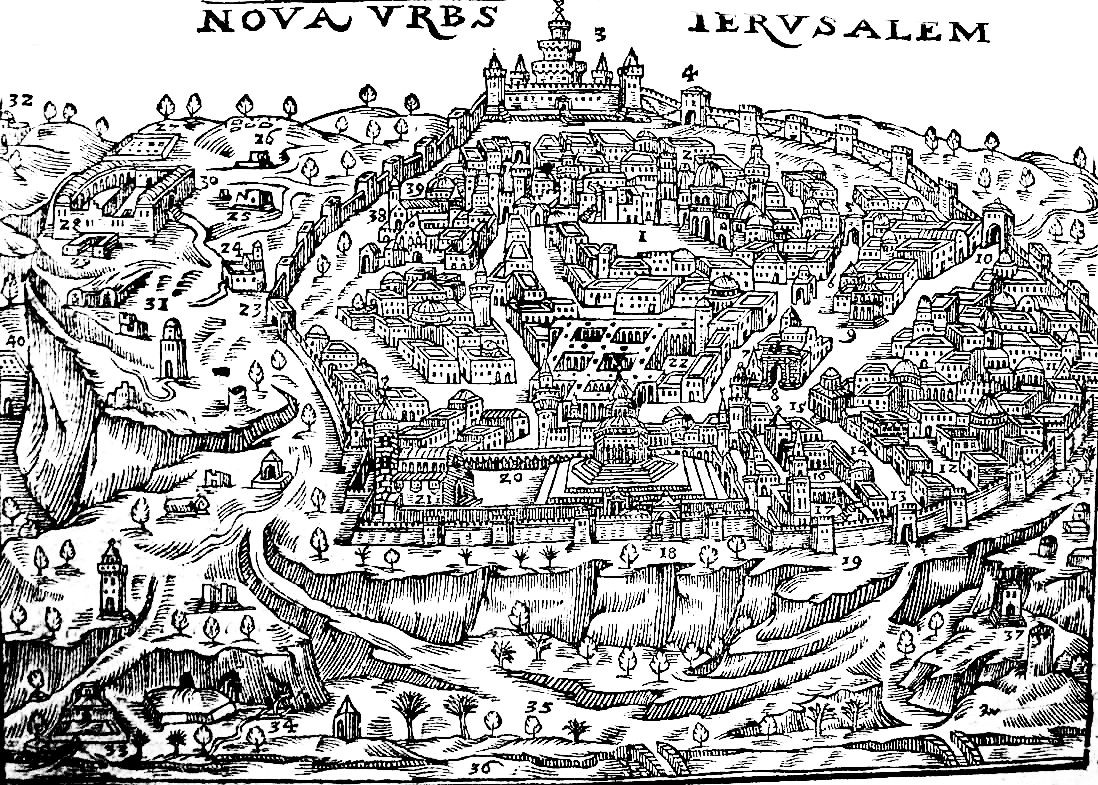
Signed veduta of Jerusalem, ca 1606 for book Putování

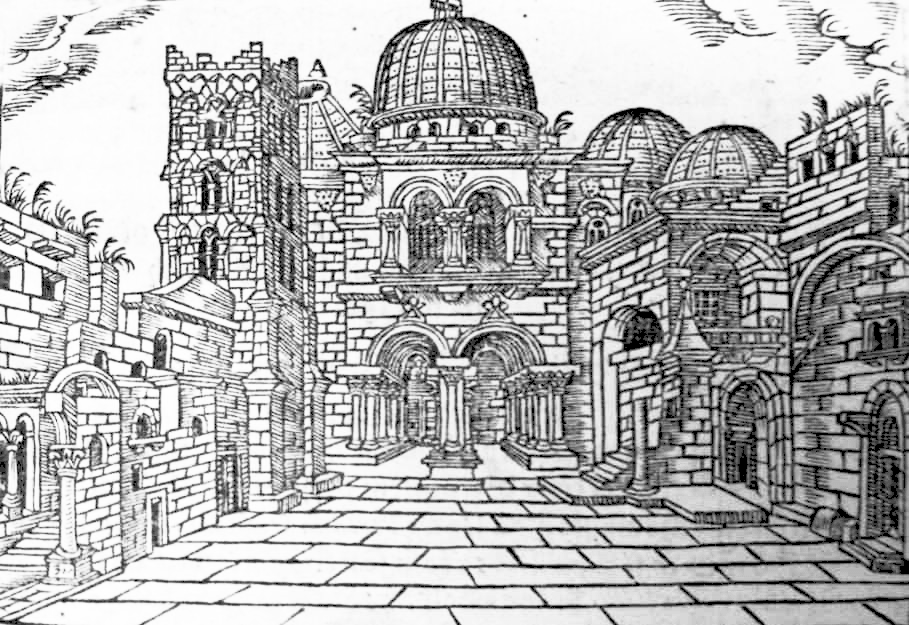
Church of the Holy Sepulchre in Jerusalem, ca 1606 for book Putování

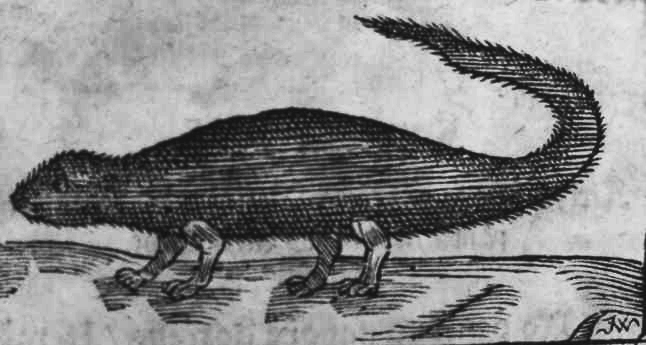
Ichneumon, woodcut for book Putování

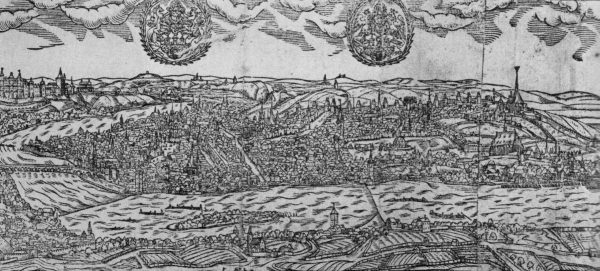
Vedute of Prague, 1601

=== Style and technique ===
Despite the existence of copperplate engraving, which allowed much finer line drawing, Willenberg used the woodcut technique throughout his life. The copper engraving was relatively expensive and did not spread until the beginning of the 17th century. The quality of Willenberger's work is very variable, which makes it difficult to attribute him woodcuts without a signature. Willenberg's technique is quite cumbersome and the depiction of figure compositions is not as skilful as in the case of other artists like Joris Hoefnagel, Pieter Stevens II, Philipp van den Bossche or Aegidius Sadeler. However, his vedute are the most valued part of his work, because they are depicted quite true to reality and with a sense of detail. Willenberg is not trying to show just the dominants, but also other parts of the cities, without stylisation. In the case of small formats, he was also well able to depict vedute in summarized form. Thanks to this, Willenberg's work was valued and reprinted several times. Today, his vedute are valued the most as a historical source. Most of his vedute are depicted from the side-view, very rarely from the bird's view. His first vedute of seven Moravian cities for Paprocki's book are quite cumbersome, parts like sky or fields lack a softness, but later vedute from Louka print-shop have more quality and finer lineation, however, the image is confusing and less plastic. Willenberg's arrival in Prague did not have a major impact on the quality of his vedute and works from Louka can be marked as the top in quality. In the case of views in Harant's travelbook, Willenberg followed sketches, but architecture is less precise in woodcuts and the landscape is very stylized. Willenberg hasn't even improved Harant's quite unskilled depiction of staffage figures, most likely to preserve authenticity. His depiction of frequently idealised Jerusalem is much more accurate than the older depictions, but his inspiration can be found, for example, in the veduta of Jerusalem by Christian van Adrichem from 1584. The same situation as with figures is apparent in the case of animals like dolphin which were unknown to Willenberg, so he followed the sketches. These animals, therefore, look like beasts or monsters. Some illustrations of animals in Harant's book were copied from a book by Conrad Gessner. From Willenberg's preserved sketches of cities, later transferred to woodcuts in Diadochos (1602), it's apparent that he simplified the views and made them more associative than documentary.

== Literature ==
- Jakubec, Ondřej (2007). "Johann Willenberger - Draughtsman and Graphic Artist of the Late Renaissance. Silesian or Moravian, Catholic or Protestant?". Śląsk i Czechy. Wspólne drogi sztuki. Wrocław: Wydawnictwo Uniwersytetu Wrocławskiego. pp. 163–173. ISBN 978-83-229-2862-2.
- Jakubec, Ondřej (2004). "Grafické dílo Jana Willenbergera a knižní tisky přelomu 16. a 17. století: Mezi realitou, imaginací a konceptualitou" [Graphic Work and Prints of Johann Willenberger around 1600. Between Reality, Imagination and Conceptuality.] (PDF). Studia Moravica II. Olomouc: Univerzita Palackého v Olomouci: 185–203.
