= Jastrzębiec coat of arms =

Polish coat of arms

Jastrzębiec
- Battle cry: Bolesta, Kamiona, Lubrza, Łazęka, Nagody, Nagórę, Zarazy
- Alternative names: Accipiter, Bolesta, Boleścic, Jastrząb, Jastrząbek, Kamiona, Łazęka, Lubrza
- Earliest mention: 999
- Cities: Bychawa, Konopnica
- Gminas: Konopnica, Rytwiany
- Families: 1738 names

Jastrzębiec (Polish pronunciation: [jaˈstʂɛmbjɛt͡s]) is one of the most ancient Polish coat of arms. Dating back to the 10th century, it has been used by Poland's oldest szlachta families and remains in use today.

== History ==
According to the 16th-century Polish-Czech writer and heraldist Bartosz Paprocki, the Jastrzębiec coat of arms derives its name from the Polish word for goshawk (jastrząb), an emblem reportedly borne by the clan's pagan ancestors.

Paprocki recounts a legend tracing the modern design of the arms to circa 999 CE, during the reign of Bolesław the Brave. According to this account, during a siege of the pagan-held mountain fortress of Łysa Góra (near modern-day Święty Krzyż), a pagan champion challenged the Christian besiegers to a single combat duel. A knight of the Jastrzębiec clan allegedly invented horseshoes to allow his mount to scale the mountain's slippery slopes, enabling him to defeat and capture the champion. After the remaining Polish forces similarly shod their horses and captured the mountain, the king rewarded the knight by adding a horseshoe and a cross to his shield, while elevating the goshawk to the crest.

Alternative heraldic traditions suggest the arms may have arrived in Poland with Lech, the mythical founder of the Polish nation. In his work Stromata, Paprocki claims that the cross was added to the arms after a family member was baptized abroad, an event that Paprocki alleges precipitated the Christianization of Poland under Mieszko I. He further asserts the antiquity of the clan by claiming that a member of the Jastrzębiec family was among the twelve legendary voivodes who once ruled the country.

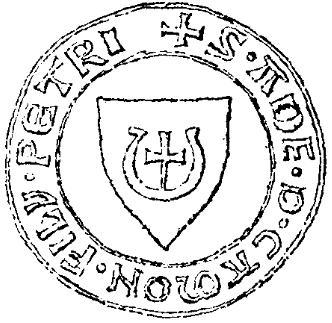
Seal with the coat of arms of Jastrzębiec, 14th century

The antiquity of the Jastrzebiec coat of arms is also evident by the fact that no other coats of arms is borne by more families. Paprocki says, in O herbach, that several hundred years ago the clan called themselves simply Jastrzebczyks. Not until after the days of Archbishop Wojciech of Gniezno did foremost members of this house began to write z Rytwian ("from Rytwiany"). Other members similarly named themselves after the estates they possessed.

Jastrezebiec's antiquity lead others coat-of-arms to be derived from it, including Dąbrowa, Zagłoba, and Pobóg. These arms are also called Boleszczyc, in Silesia, and Lazanki, in Mazovia. In other places Jastrzebczyks are called by names coming from the word for "goshawk", Kaniowa or Kudbrzowa. In Paprocki's day there was a Jastrzebiec castle, belonging to the Zborowskis; General Piotr Zborowski from Rytwiany, Kraków voivode, tore it down, dug it out, and had a large pond put in its place.

=== Ancestors of this house ===
Based on a grant of privilege to a monastery in 999, Paprocki cites the most ancient member of this house as being a castellan of Sandomierz, a man named Mszczuj. Mszczuj's two sons Mszczuj and Jan, who signed themselves "from Jakuszewice", were both made canons in Kraków by Bishop Lambert in 1061. In 1084, Dlugosz wrote that the Jastrzebczyks who came from Hungary with Mieczyslaw, son of Boleslaw the Bold.

Derszlaw was cup-bearer for King Bolesław Wry-mouth in 1114. Bolesław IV the Curly granted the title to the villages of Jakuszewice and Kobelniki to Derszlaw's sons Wojciech and Derszlaw, of whom Wojciech was the Sandomierz standard-bearer. Paprocki cites a fragment of his in O herbach, but the long stretch of time between them and their father, 166 years, indicates that they were not the sons of Derszlaw the cup-bearer. Paprocki cites a monastery grant of privilege given in 1199 for Borzywoj and Derszlaw Jastrzebczyk, heirs to Jakuszowice. He also includes Piotr, son of Wojciech, the Sandomierz standard-bearer.

Swentoslaw, a pastor from Poznań and Gniezno canon, was chosen to be bishop of Poznań; already of an advanced age, he had retired, but he yielded to those urging him and accepted the office. He spent only a year at this see before his death in 1176 and was buried in the church. Nakiel. w Miechov. fol. 66, praises the good works of this Swietoslaw, for saving his monastery at its beginning with generous alms; he ascribes to Swietoslaw the Pobog arms. Yet Długosz in Vitae Episc. Posnan, and others, call him a Jastrebczyk. Paprocki writes that in Jędrzejów a grave from the year 1206 is covered with a stone on which the Jastrzębiec arms are still visible, but the letters can no longer be read.

Piotr Brevis (called Maly ("small"), as brevis is Latin for "short") was chosen to be the nineteenth bishop of Płock in 1254. In the fifth year of his episcopate, he moved to another see. However in Vitae Episc. Plocens, Lubienski ascribed no coat-of-arms to him yet wrote Piotr Brevis was of a noble clan. Paprocki in O herbach, added that Piotr Brevis was a Jastrzebczyk.

Silesian Bishop Jan of Wrocław was the first Pole to ascend the episcopacy, inasmuch as only Italians had held the position before. Bishop Jan of Wrocław elected in 1062, presided for 10 years, and died in 1072. This is attested to by Dlugosz in Kronika, wherein he wrote that Bishop Jan of Wrocław was of the Jastrzebiec clan.

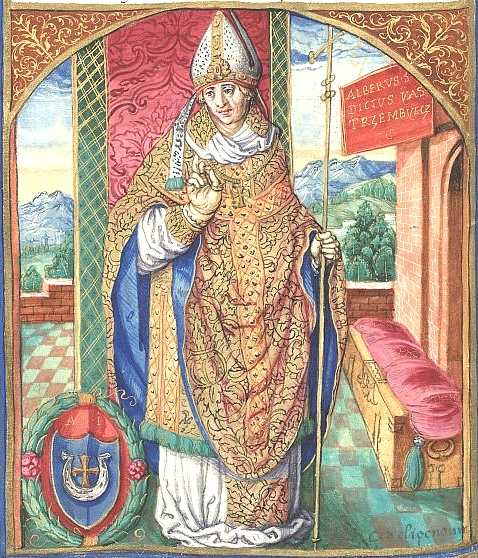
Portrait of Wojciech Jastrzębiec, 16th century

Additional forebears of this clan are Michal, castellan of Kraków in 1225; Mistuj, voivode of Kraków in 1242; Scibor, voivode of Leczyca in 1242; and Msciug, voivode of Sandomierz in 1342. A letter of Kazimierz the Great, King of Poland, given to the Strzelno monastery, mentions, inter praesentes, Mszczuj, Kraków chamberlain.

Jedrzej, Bishop of Vilna, called "Vasilo" by the Lithuanians, was an apostolic shepherd in the days of King Władysław II Jagiełło. Kromer. In 1399, Jedrzej proselytized Christianity in pagan Lithuania. Marcisz, brother of Bishop Jedrzej, endowed the Franciscan Fathers in Nowe Miasto with a monastery and he bought Zborów, from which came the family of Zborowskis.

Wojciech, Archbishop of Gniezno, was born in the village of Lubnica. His father, possessed of a meager fortune, gave up Wojciech to the Bensowa parish church. As Dlugosz wrote n Vitae Episcop. Posnan.:

I give you up, my son, not into the ranks of students but of bishops. Remember, when you have become a bishop, do not forget your current standing, in which you see both your mother and me, your brothers and sisters: this lack of means in which you were born is greater than could fade from your memory if you had the greatest fortune. When you become a bishop, do this for me, make a church of brick in this place where I give you up for schooling.

Wojciech listened to all of this and promised to fulfill the exhortation as a paternal order. The hopes of both were realized, for Wojciech, soon became a priest, from being a Kraków scholastic, as Dlugosz says, or from being a Kraków dean and Poznan pastor, he became the mitred prelate of Poznan in 1399. Tearing down the wooden church in Bensowa, he had a brick one built in 1407, and later settled the friars of St. Paul the Hermit there, and gave to it the villages of Bensowa, Bensowka, Bydlowa, and Bystronowice. Besides this, he founded the collegiate church in Warsaw, and the cathedral.

Thus for 14 years Wojciech held that post at that church in a laudable manner, so that he was held in high regard by all, both for his wisdom, which was demonstrated at every chancellery function, and for his piety. But he put himself under great strain when, having removed Piotr Wiss, of Leszczyc arms, from the Kraków episcopacy. He recalled Wiss to that of Poznan and he himself occupied the Kraków bishopric in 1412. He had many quarrels because of it: for as soon as the matter arose at the Council of Konstanz it moved all the priests assembled there with compassion for Peter Wiss, and surely Wiss would have returned to his bishopric if he had not died at that point.

Wojciech, more secure after Wiss's death, founded a city, having cleared some woods, and called it Jastrzebie. He endowed and gave to it two parish churches in Sandomierz province: one in Wysokie, in Lublin district; the other in Kortynicak, in Sandomierz district. He designated a tithe for the altar of St. Agnes, in Kraków diocese. Then in 1423, he was elevated to the rank of metropolitan and primate, and there left a memory of his generosity, funding two benefices, one theological and one juridical, as well as a third in Kalisz. He set up an altar in Leczyca, returned regular canons to Klodawa, and raised their church to collegiate rank. He died in 1436, an important, judicious man and a great lover of his country, as Dlugosz and Damalew praised him in Vitae Archiepisc. Gnesn., and Starowol. in Vitae Episc. Cracov.

Wojciech had amassed considerable wealth, which he left to his successors, and while yet alive bought for them Rytwiany, in Sandomierz district, and Borzyslawice, in Leczyca district, where he funded benefices. The sources of that wealth were suspect, in that the curate of the Poznań Cathedral had shown him the collection and treasury of the ancient kings of Poland, of which the curates had passed on knowledge in secret, each to the next, until that time.

From that time, Wojciech's successors began to sign their names as z Rytwian ("from Rytwiany"): his brother was Scibor, voivode of Leczyca, who had twenty sons. Paprocki saw all their portraits in the Bensowa church, but the signatures under them could not be read. Eight of the sons died in the Prussian war, the other twelve were various castellans.

In the Jastrzębiec family, there is also the case of a man from the Witowski family, who, on the basis of his marriage, left for Russia, from where, in the next generation, a high-ranking aristocrat Katarina Wiltawsky returned to the vicinity of Krakow, who married a Polish German (Pruska), who took her surnames and Russian titles of nobility. Their descendant Baron Wiltawský attended the coronation of Emperor Charles VI. in Prague. The descendants of this line remained settled in the vicinity of Ratibórz and Opava. Books: Crönungs - Ceremoniel, Oder Accurate Nachricht, was Bey der Crönung Des Aller

== Blazon ==
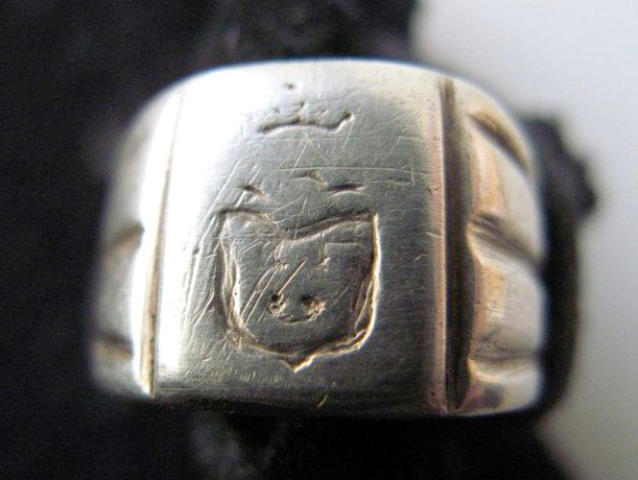
Jastrzebiec coat-of-arms signet-ring. This signet ring belonged to Czesław Jankowski h. Jastrzębiec. Hand made in 1943, with silver from an old Polish coin, by a prisoner at a Nazi-German prisoner-of-war camp for Polish officers.

The following is from the classic heraldic reference Herbarz Polski, by Kasper Niesiecki, S. J., Leipzig edition, 1839-1846. In this book, for each herb (clan shield or coat of arms) the blazon, or verbal description of the arms, is first given in authentic heraldic style, followed by a translation from the Polish description by Niesiecki.

Arms: azure, a horseshoe reversed, between its branches, a small cross patée en abime, both or. Upon a wreath of the colors mantled of his liveries whereon is set for a crest: out of a ducal coronet, a hawk proper, wings surgent, belled and jessed, holding in its dexter talons, a charge of the shield.

On a shield in a blue field is a gold horseshoe, with its heels pointed straight up, and in its center a cross; on the helmet over a crown is a goshawk with its wings slightly raised for flight, facing the right side of the shield. On its legs are small bells and a leather strap, in its right talon it holds a horseshoe with cross, like those on the shield.

In heraldry, the right and left sides of a shield are considered from the standpoint of the bearer—i. e., the one holding the shield. His right would be your left and vice versa. The tinctures (colors) are as follows: azure = blue; gules = red; sable = black; or = gold; argent = silver; and vert = green. All charges (pictures) on a shield are assumed to be facing dexter (bearer's right side) unless otherwise specified. In Polish heraldry, all animals or birds are assumed to be in their natural coloring unless otherwise specified.

== Notable bearers ==
- Jan Lutomirski
- Adam Chmielowski
- Xawery Stanisław Czernicki
- Count Antoni Litwicki, son of Jan Karol Litwicki (Head of State Audit), brother of Michal
- Count Michal Litwicki (1796–1856) officer in the November Rising (1830–1831), second lieutenant, then captain in the 2nd Mazurian Cavalry Regiment in the army of the Kingdom of Poland (1830)

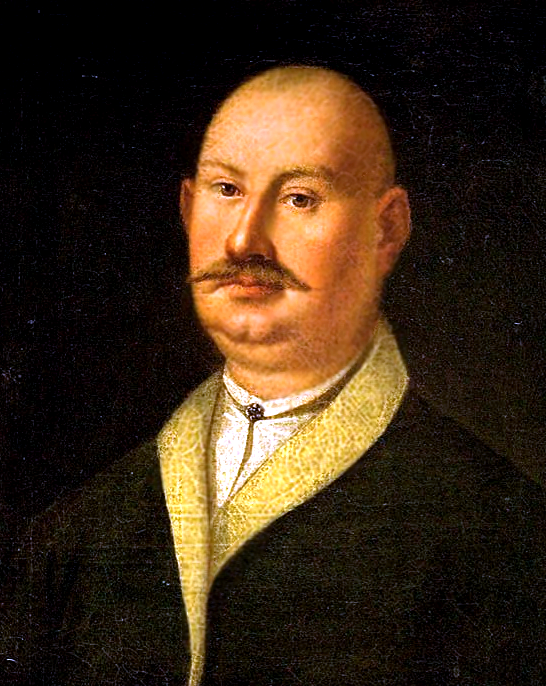
Zachariasz Mysyrowicz (portrait c. 1790), Royal Secretary and Starost of Kamianets-Podilskyi

- Andrzej Niemirowicz
- Zdzisław Peszkowski
- Edmund Taczanowski
- Władysław Taczanowski
- Dominik Dziewanowski
- Marian Kamil Dziewanowski
- Napoleon Baniewicz
- Kazimierz Dziewanowski First post-communist Polish ambassador to the US.
- Martin Kunert
- Both family
- Sir Conrad Swan
- Jan Skrzetuski is a fictional character created by Polish author Henryk Sienkiewicz in the novel With Fire and Sword.

== Variations ==
Coat of arms of Abrahamowicz (Abramowicz) family (16th century)

Coat of arms of Białachowski family

Coat of arms of Brzozowski family

Coat of arms of Chyliński family

Coat of arms of Ciborski family

Coat of arms of the Czarnowron clan

Coat of arms of Czernicki from Płock

Coat of arms of Czernyszew family (Ukraine) (1765)

Domaradzki II (variant)

Coat of arms of Dziengiel (Dzingel) family (Prussia) (According to Urski)

Coat of arms of Gierałtowski family from Opole (According to Ostrowski)

Coat of arms of Gliszczyński family (17th century)

Coat of arms of Grębecki family from Brześć-Kujawski (18th century)

Jastrzębiec I – standard variation (According to Ostrowski)

Jastrzębiec III – variation (According to Ostrowski)

Jastrzębiec IV – coat of arms of Kierski, Konopnicki, Leszczyński and Zielonka families

Jastrzębiec V – coat of arms of Brzozowski and Koczasski families

Jastrzębiec VI – coat of arms of Turłaj family (According to Ostrowski)

Coat of arms of Kapica family from Powiat Bialski in Podlasie

Kiersnowski II – coat of arms of Kiersnowski family (Lithuanuia)

Coat of arms of Koczański family from Koczań near Radom (17th century)

Coat of arms of Kościeleski family from Greater Poland and Silesia (17th century; according to Urski)

Coat of arms of Kościeleski family from Greater Poland and Silesia (17th century; according to Ostrowski)

Coat of arms of the Kurowski family

Coat of arms of Lemnicki – Bartoszewicz family, (According to Ostrowski and Chrząński)

Coat of arms of Lemnicki – Bartoszewicz family, (According to Urski)

Coat of arms of Łukomski family

Coat of arms of Mierczyński family frok, Łęczyca (16th century)

Coat of arms of the Marquesses Myszkowski (1597)

Coat of arms of Niemyski family from Niemyj and Podlasie (17th century)

Variant II (Niemyski family)

Coat of arms of the Nycz family

Coat of arms of Pełka (Silesia) (18th century)

Variant II (Pełka II)

Coat of arms of Jastrzębiec-Pełkowski (Prussia) (17th century)

Princely House of Połubiński

Coat of arms of both Rosyniec and Górka families

Coat of arms of Rudnicki family, (Prussia and Greater Poland) (17th century)

Ennoblement of Schabicki family (1765)

Coat of arms of Skopowski family from Skopow (17th century)

Ennoblement of Skórski family, (Livonia, Lublin Voivodship, Sandomierz Voivodship) (17th century)

Coat of arms of Szaszewicz (Sasiewicz) family from Troki Voivodship

Coat of arms of Szaszewski family

Coat of arms of Turłaj family

Coat of arms of Unierzycki family

Coat of arms of Welinowicz family

Coat of arms of the Zagłoba clan

== Gallery ==
Coat of arms of Jan of Rokycany (14th century)

Ennoblement of Erazm Bełza in 1591 (According to Ostrowski)

Ennoblement of Erazma Bełzy in 1591 (According to Trelińska)

Coat of arms of Adamow Wierzchowski (1635)

Coat of arms of Bernard Jaczyński (18th century)

Coat of arms of Józef Sikorski (18th century)

Ennoblement of Antoni Kozłowski in 1768

Coat of arms of Count Stanisław and Jerzy Piniński (1780)

Coat of arms of Count Marcin Koziebrodzki (1781)

Coat of arms of Baron Maciej Niemyski (1783)

Ennoblement of Daniel Skowroński (1790)

Coat of arms of Count Maksymilian Zborowski (1792)

Coat of arms of Count Ignacy Bobrowski (1800)

Coat of arms of Count Stanisław Grzębski (1804)

Coat of arms of Count Andrzej Kuczkowski (1807)

Coat of arms of Baron Józef Borowski (1808)

Coat of arms of Count Antoni Karśnicki (1821)

Coat of arms of Count Alfons Taczanowski (1854)

Armorial achievement of Sir Conrad Swan (1924-2019)

== See also ==
- Polish heraldry
- Heraldry
- Coat of arms
- Mystkowski
- Taczanowski
