= Bartosz Paprocki =

Czech and Polish genealogist, historian and writer

Bartłomiej Paprocki (Bartoloměj Paprocký z Hlohol)
- Born: c. 1543; Stara Wola, Poland (now Poland)
- Died: September 24, 1614 (aged 70–71); Lwów, Poland, Polish-Lithuanian Commonwealth (now the Ukraine)
- Education: Jagiellonian University
- Occupations: Historiographer; Heraldist; Genealogist
- Parent(s): Jędrzej Paprocki; Elżbieta Jeżewska

Bartosz Paprocki, in Czech known as Bartoloměj Paprocký z Hlohol a Paprocké Vůle (c. 1543 – 27 December 1614), was a Polish and Czech historiographer, translator, poet, heraldist, and a pioneering figure in Polish and Bohemian/Czech genealogy. Often referred to as the "father of Polish and Czech genealogy", Praprocki's works, despite their methodological flaws, remain invaluable. He was active in Poland until 1588, when political circumstances led him to emigrate to Moravia and Bohemia. While his approach to sources was often uncritical, and he sometimes even invented them, his writings are a crucial repository of knowledge from his era. Additionally, Praprocki preserved numerous genealogical-historical sources and legends from the nobility milieu, many of which are now lost.

== Life ==
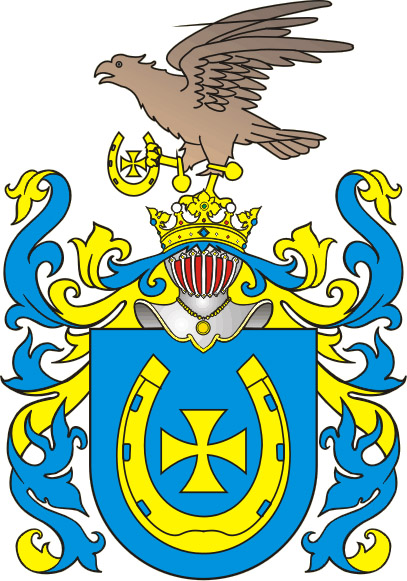
Jastrzębiec coat of arms borne by Paprocki family

Paprocki was born in the parish of Paprocka Wola near the town Sierpc in Greater Poland, Kingdom of Poland. He was the son of Jędrzej Paprocki and Elżbieta Jeżewska. Born into a noble family, Paprocki's family were members of the Polish nobility, who bore the Jastrzębiec Polish coat of arms. He studied at the Jagiellonian University in Kraków, then stayed with wealthy relatives, among others. He began writing poems and soon after dedicated himself to historiography and heraldry. His works devoted to the nobility of the Polish Crown Gniazdo Cnoty (1578) and Herby rycerstwa polskiego (1584) deepened and contributed to consolidating the knowledge of the genealogy of Poland's noble families.

Paprocki married Jadwiga Kossobudzka, his wife was the daughter of a castellan (burgrave) from Sierpc and the widow of her former husband Wisniowski. Paprocki's wife was a wealthy woman and older than Paprocki. They had no children and his marriage was unfortunate; Paprocki was tyrannized by his wife. Paprocki's unfortunate marital experience, led him to flee his home, where he remained a fierce misogynist until his death.

Summoned to Warsaw, Paprocki worked for Andrzej Taranowski, who was secretary to king Sigismund II Augustus and briefly Polish ambassador to the court of Sultan Selim II in Constantinople (Istanbul). On returning home, Paprocki learned of his wife's death, which occurred in 1572. On his return he also received the dignity of cup-bearer (Polish: Podczaszy) of Dobrzyń Land, having settled there.

Between the years 1570-80 Paprocki aligned with the unfortunate political efforts of the Zborowski family, joined ranks with the Catholic Party and supported the Austrian Habsburg's candidacy of Maximilian II, Holy Roman Emperor for the Polish throne. Paprocki supported the Danzig rebellion, and in 1577 participated in the Siege of Danzig. Following the unsuccessful efforts of Maximilian III, Archduke of Austria for the Polish crown and after the victory of Sigismund III Vasa in 1588 at the Battle of Byczyna (War of the Polish Succession), Paprocki was forced to leave Poland and went into political exile in Moravia.

Paprocki spent the following 22 years in Czech lands. He learned the Czech language and wrote alongside new poems about the history and the coat of arms of Bohemia and Moravia. He also translated the poems of Jan Kochanowski. Later he received Bohemian indygenat (nobility citizenship naturalization). He was an admirer of the scientific achievements of his compatriot Sendivogius' (who then lived and worked at the court of Emperor Rudolf II in Prague), whom he dedicated the third part of his book Ogród królewski... published in 1599.

In 1610, at the end of his life, Paprocki returned to Poland. Destitute he lived in Wąchock and Ląd monasteries.

Died suddenly on 27 December 1614 in Lviv, and was buried in a crypt at the Franciscan abbey in that city.

== Works ==
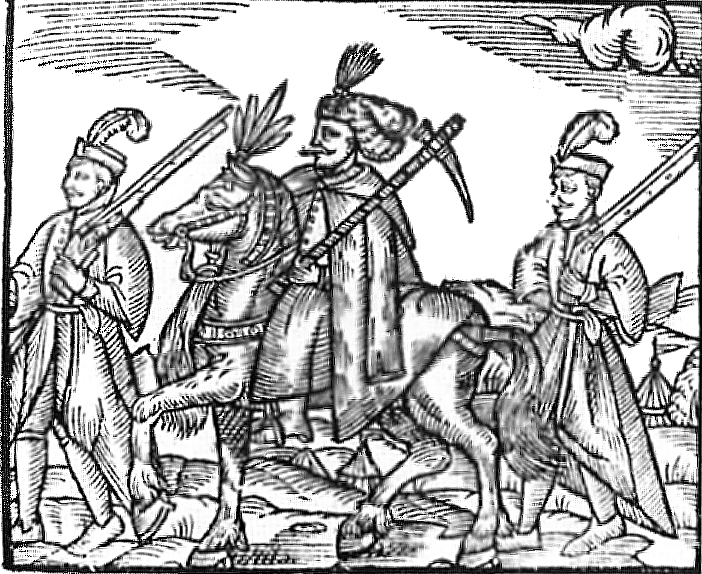
Illustration from Paprocki's 16th-century book titled Hetman

=== In Polish ===
- Dziesiecioro przykazań meżowo, Kraków, 1575 ("Ten Commandments for Men")
- Koło rycerskie w którem rozmaite zwierzęta swe rozmowy wiodą, Kraków, 1576 ("Knights Gathering in Which Various Animals Hold Their Talks")
- Panosza to jest wysławianie panów i paniąt ziem ruskich i podolskich, Kraków, 1575
- Historia żalosna o pratkosci i okrutnosci Tatarskiej, Kraków, 1575
- Gniazdo Cnoty, Zkąd Herby Rycerstwa slawnego Krolestwa Polskiego..., Kraków, 1578 ("The Nest of Virtues, whence the coat of arms of the Knights of the Polish Kingdom, Grand Duchy of Lithuania, Ruthenia, Prussia, Masovia, Samogitia, and other States to the kingdom of the dukes, and lords have their genesis")
- Krótki a prawdziwy wypis z jechania do ziemi Wołoskiej Iwana Wojewody, którego Podkową zowią, Kraków, 1578 ("Short but True Excerpt of Journey of Iwan Wojewoda, Nicknamed ′Horseshoe′, into the Land of Wallachia")
- Hetman, Kraków, 1578 ("Head Commander")
- Król, Kraków, 1578 ("King")
- Testament starca jednego, który miał trzech synow, Kraków, 1578
- Historya barzo piękna y żałosna o Equanusie Krolu Skockim, Kraków, 1578 ("Really Beautiful and Sad Story about Scottish King Equanius")
- Wesele Bogiń, Kraków, 1581 ("Wedding Goddess")
- Herby rycerstwa polskiego na pięcioro ksiąg rozdzielone, Kraków, 1584 ("The heraldic arms of the Polish knighthood in five volumes")
- Upominek albo przestroga zacnemu narodowi polskiemu i wszystkim stanom Wielkiego Księstwa Litewskiego, 1587 ("A Gift or Warning to the Noble Polish Nation and All the Estates of the Grand Duchy of Lithuania")
- Pamięć nierządu w Polsce przez dwie fakcye uczynionego w roku 1587, 1588 ("The Memory of the Disorder Committed in Poland by Two Factions in 1587")
- Nauka rozmanitych philosophów obieranie żony, Kraków, 1590 ("The lesson of different philosophers about wife choosing...")
- Gwałt na pogany, 1595 ("Haste Against Heathens")
- Próba cnót dobrych, Kraków, kolem 1595
- Ogród królewski w którym krótko opisuje historye Cesarzów, Królow Polskich i Czeskich, arcyksiążąt Austryi, książąt Ruskich, Prague, 1599 ("Royal Garden, in Which I Write Briefly About the History of Emperors, Polish and Bohemian Kings, Austrian Archdukes and Russian Dukes")
- Cathalogus arcybiskupów, Kraków, 1613
- Nauka i przestrogi na różne przypadki ludzkie, Kraków, 1613 ("'Lesson and a warning for different human cases...")
- Naprawa Rzeczypospoletej, Kraków, 1895
- Upominek, Kraków, 1900
- Odpowiedź, Kraków, 1910

=== In Czech ===
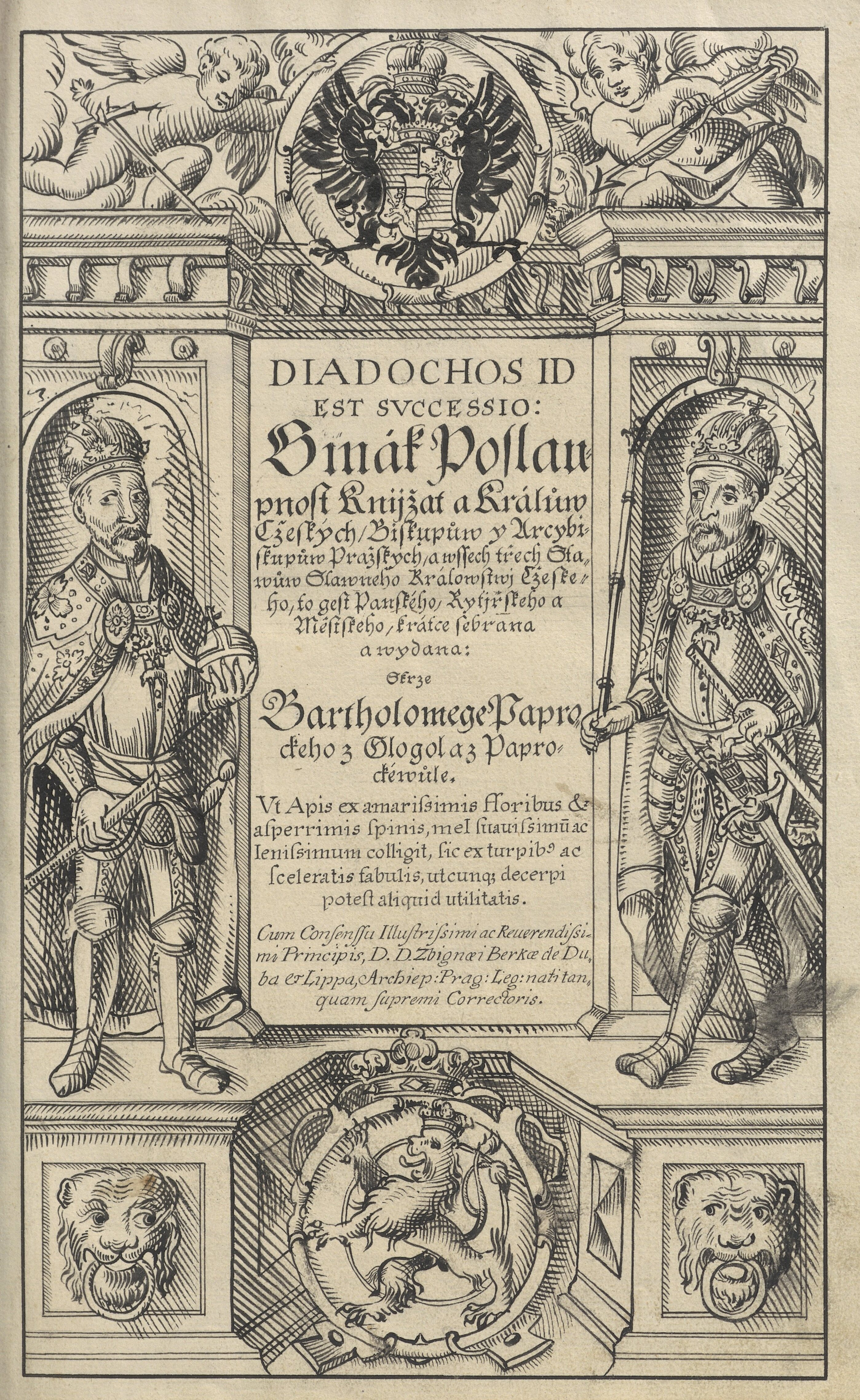
Diadochos (1602), the most renowned historical-genealogical work written by Paprocki during his Czech era

- Zrcadlo slavného Markrabí moravského, 1593 ("Mirror of the Illustrious Moravian Margraviate") – illustrated with woodcuts by Jan Willenberg; the work was originally written in Polish, translated into Czech by the Lutheran pastor Jan Vodička
- Kvalt na pohany, 1595 ("Haste Against Heathens")
- Nová kratochvíle, Prague, 1579–1600 ("New Pastime")
- Ecclesia, Prague, 1601 ("The Church")
- Kšaft, Prague, 1601 ("Testament")
- Půst tělesný, Prague, 1601 ("Fasting")
- Třinácte tabulí věku lidského, Prague, 1601 ("Thirteen Tables of Human Life")
- Diadochos id est successio, jinak posloupnost knížat a králů českých, biskupů a arcibiskupů pražských a všech třech stavů slavného království českého, to jest panského, rytířského a městského, Prague, 1602 ("Diadochi, i.e. the Sequence of Bohemian Dukes and Kings, Bishops and Archbishops of Prague and All Three Estates of the Famous Bohemian Kingdom, the Lords, Knights and Burghers")
- O válce turecké a jiné příběhy: výbor z Diadochu ("The Turkish War and Other Narratives: an Anthology of the Diadochi")
- Obora aneb Zahrada v které rozličná stvoření rozmlouvání svá mají, Prague, 1602 ("Game Park or Garden in Which Various Creatures Hold Their Talks")
- Historie o příbězích v království Uherském, Prague, 1602 ("History About Stories in the Hungarian Kingdom")
- Štambuch slezský, Brno, 1609 ("Silesian Album amicorum", or book of friends)

== See also ==
- Polish literature
- Polish heraldry
- Czech literature
