= Konopnicki =

Konopnicki (feminine: Konopnicka) is a Polish surname. It may be variously transliterated as: Konopnicky, Konopnitsky, Konopnitzki, Konopnizki. Some of them use Jastrzębiec coat of arms. Notable people with the surname include:

- Adam Konopnicki (1876–1955), Polish teacher, educator, poet, translator
- Jan Konopnicki (1905–1980), Polish educator, researcher of education
- Maria Konopnicka (1842–1910), Polish poet, novelist, children's writer
- William Konopnicki (1945–2012), American politician
