= Journey from Bohemia to the Holy Land, by way of Venice and the Sea =

17th-century Czech travelogue of the Near East and Italy

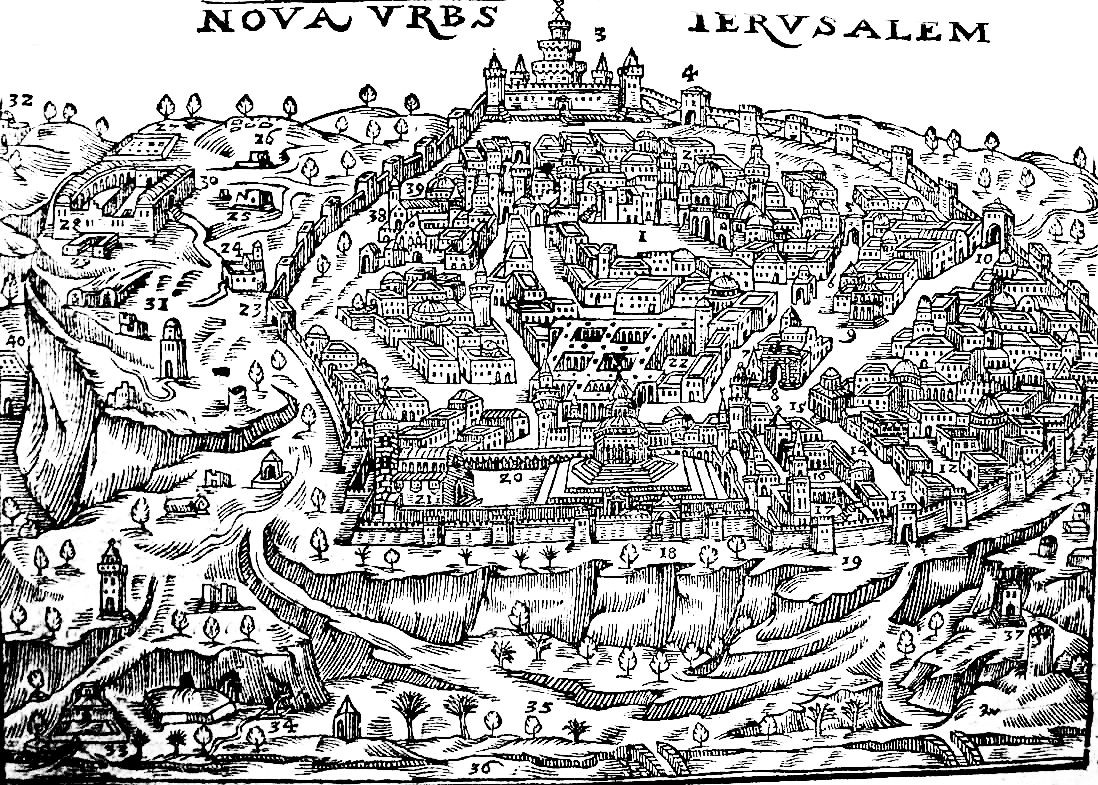
A 1606 engraving of Jerusalem by Jan Willenberg, travel companion of Harant.

Journey from Bohemia to the Holy Land, by way of Venice and the Sea is a travel book to Jerusalem written by Kryštof Harant, a Czech nobleman and published in 1608. The complete title transliterated into modern Czech is: Cesta z Království Českého do Benátek, odtud do země Svaté, země Judské a dále do Egypta, a potom na horu Oreb, Sinai a Sv. Kateřiny v Pusté Arábii (literally Journey from Bohemia to Venice, from here to the Holy Land, Judea and to Egypt, later to Oreb, Sinai and St. Catherine mountain in desert Arabia). The book is probably the first published account of the Near East by a Czech traveller.

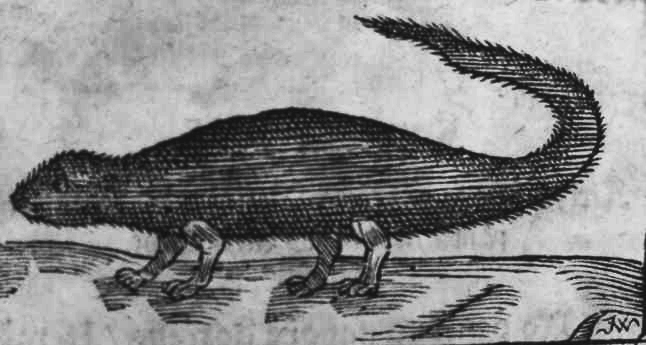
A 1606 engraving of an Egyptian mongoose by Jan Willenberg.

Kryštof Harant z Polžic a Bezdružic (1564–1621) was a renaissance man with a broad range of interests. In 1598 he went as a pilgrim to the Holy Land, returning at the beginning of the next year.

The book, written in Czech and richly illustrated (about 50 woodcuts by Harant), describes in two parts the travel and the details of visited lands. As a typical example of renaissance literature it mixes entertainment with knowledge and heavily references religion. Before the journey Harant studied all the available literature describing the region and frequently cites others in his work. The book gives a very detailed description of religious places and their relation to Christianity, habits of natives and natural and man-made curiosities. It stayed popular for a long time and was published for the last time in the mid-19th century. In 1638 Harant's youngest brother, Jan Jiří, translated the text into German.

== The journey ==
The journey commenced on April 2, 1598 when Harant, Count Hermann Czernin von und zu Chudenitz and one servant left from Plzeň. On April 19 they arrived in Venice. Waiting on the ship, they visited Padua and Ferrara. On July 12, pilgrims boarded a ship and through the chain of the Greek islands arrived in Jerusalem on September 3. Because the Habsburg Empire was at the time in a war with the Ottoman Empire and Harant fought at the war the pilgrims disguised themselves as Italian monks from Venice and later as Polish (both powers being in peace with Ottomans at the time). They visited several locations in Judea and later turned toward Egypt. On October 4 they reached in Cairo and then visited the Sinai Peninsula. When returning, Harant was attacked by wandering Arabs who stole everything and stripped him naked. Only by chance the bandits didn't discover 22 ducats, hidden in a coat. From Cairo, Harant traveled to Alexandria and on November 12 boarded a ship back to Venice, with one remaining thaler and suffering from exhaustion and sickness. The ship arrived in Venice on December 26, 1598, and from here Harant returned to Bohemia.

== Literature ==
- Marie Koldinská: Kryštof Harant z Polžic a Bezdružic: Cesta intelektuála k popravišti (Path of intellectual to the gallows), 2004, ISBN 80-7185-537-5. The book tries to reconstruct the details of the voyage.
