= Wojciech Długoraj =

Polish composer (c. 1557 – after 1619)

Wojciech Długoraj (c. 1557 – after 1619), also called Wiecesław Długoraj, Adalbert Długoraj and Gostinensis, was a Polish Renaissance composer and lutenist.

== Biography ==
His birthplace is unknown, with Polish Gostyń and Ukrainian Gostynets as possibilities, stemming from Dlugoraj's Latin appellation "Gostinensis", but the variants of these toponyms are extremely common in Eastern Europe. He was initially active at the court of Samuel Zborowski, between 1583 and 1585 also at the royal court of Stefan Batory.

Zborowski, Długoraj's first master, was so cruel that the lutenist fled his court. He found employment with a new master who treated him well, but was discovered and compelled to resume his duties with Zborowski. Długoraj was able to escape his plight when he found incriminating letters of his master's, which he transmitted to the king via Jan Zamoyski. Zborowski was eventually executed, but Długoraj was forced to flee to Germany for fear of Zborowski's heirs, who swore revenge. He apparently lived out his years abroad.

== Works ==
Długoraj is notable for a number of fantasies, villanellas and dances. A large number of his works have been preserved in lute manuscripts.

== Sources ==
- P. Poźniak, art. "Długoraj Wojciech" Encyklopedia Muzyczna. Red.: E. Dziębowska. Tom 2, p. 417. Kraków, PWM, 1984
- Paprocki, W. - Herby rycerstwa polskiego. Kraków 1584
