= Hieronymus (bishop of Wrocław) =

Polish bishop

Jerome or Hieronymos was the early medieval Bishop of Wrocław, Poland from 1046–1062.

Little is known about his origins, career or his episcopal work. What is known is that following the establishment of the diocese around 1000 AD, it was aborted by a pagan revolt in around 1031.

There were plans to incorporate the area into Czech dioceses but at the Synod of Mainz in 1049 Pope Leo IX agreed to reactivate the diocese in Silesia and he appointed Jerome as Bishop. It is possible that he could only take his bishopric in Wrocław as late as 1050. At this time Silesia was still mission territory, there were few churches and the connection to the wider church was limited. The site of Wrocław Cathedral at this time had a simple wooden church known as Hieronymusdom built from 1051 to 1069. Jerome's true base of operation at this time was probably Ryczyn rather than Wrocław.

In 1057 he participated in the Synod of Pöhlde. and he died in 1062.

Religious titles
Preceded by Jan	Bishop of Wrocław; 1051–1062	Succeeded by Jan I
