= Samuel Zborowski =

Polish military commander (c. 1540 – 1584)

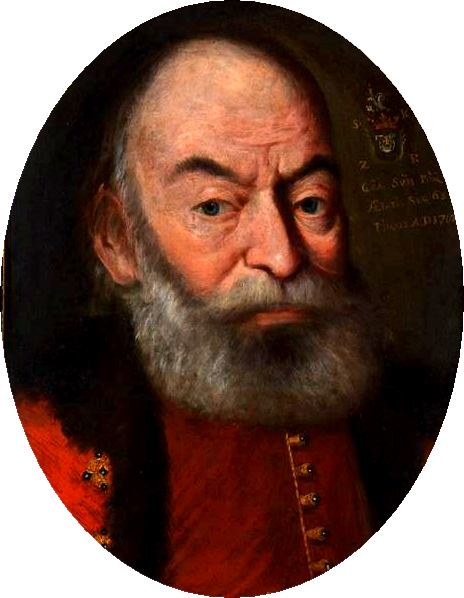
- Born: c. 1540
- Died: 26 May 1584; Kraków
- Parent: Marcin Zborowski
- Relatives: Piotr Zborowski (brother); Krzysztof Zborowski (brother); Jan Zborowski (brother); Andrzej Zborowski (brother)

Samuel Zborowski (c. 1540 – 26 May 1584) was a Polish military commander and a notable member of the szlachta (Polish nobility). He is best remembered for having been executed by supporters of the Polish king Stefan Batory and chancellor Jan Zamoyski; an event which caused much uproar among the contemporary Polish nobility.

== Biography ==
Son of Marcin Zborowski and brother to Andrzej, Jan, Krzysztof and Piotr, Samuel was an heir of a significant fortune within Poland. His family was notable for its wealth and influence at the royal court of Poland, his father was a castellan of Kraków and his brother Jan was a personal secretary of the king Sigismund II of Poland and one of the most influential people of the epoch.

Zborowski rose to the power of a Royal rotmistrz at the court of Sigismund II. The title, quite prestigious at the time, was seen as a base for further titles and powers. After Sigismund's death and the election of Henry III de Valois as the next King of Poland, a tournament was held at the Wawel Castle in honour of the new monarch on 23 February 1574. Zborowski had the honour of throwing his gauntlet as the first knight, yet his proposal of a fight was not responded by any respectable nobleman. Instead, the gauntlet was taken up by certain Karwat, one of non-noble soldiers of the castellan of Wojnice Jan Tęczyński. After Karwat defeated Zborowski's servant in a duel, Zborowski felt this as a serious offence and attacked Tęczyński himself, in the presence of a new monarch. Castellan of Przemyśl Andrzej Wapowski tried to calm down the fighters, but was hit with Zborowski's mace and was badly hurt. Wapowski refused to rest and instead started a campaign against Zborowski; his wound got infected and he died a week later. Although a murder committed during a Sejm (Polish parliament) or in presence of a monarch was punishable by death, the new king did not want to start conflicts with the mighty family of Zborowski and sentenced him to banishment, without infamy.

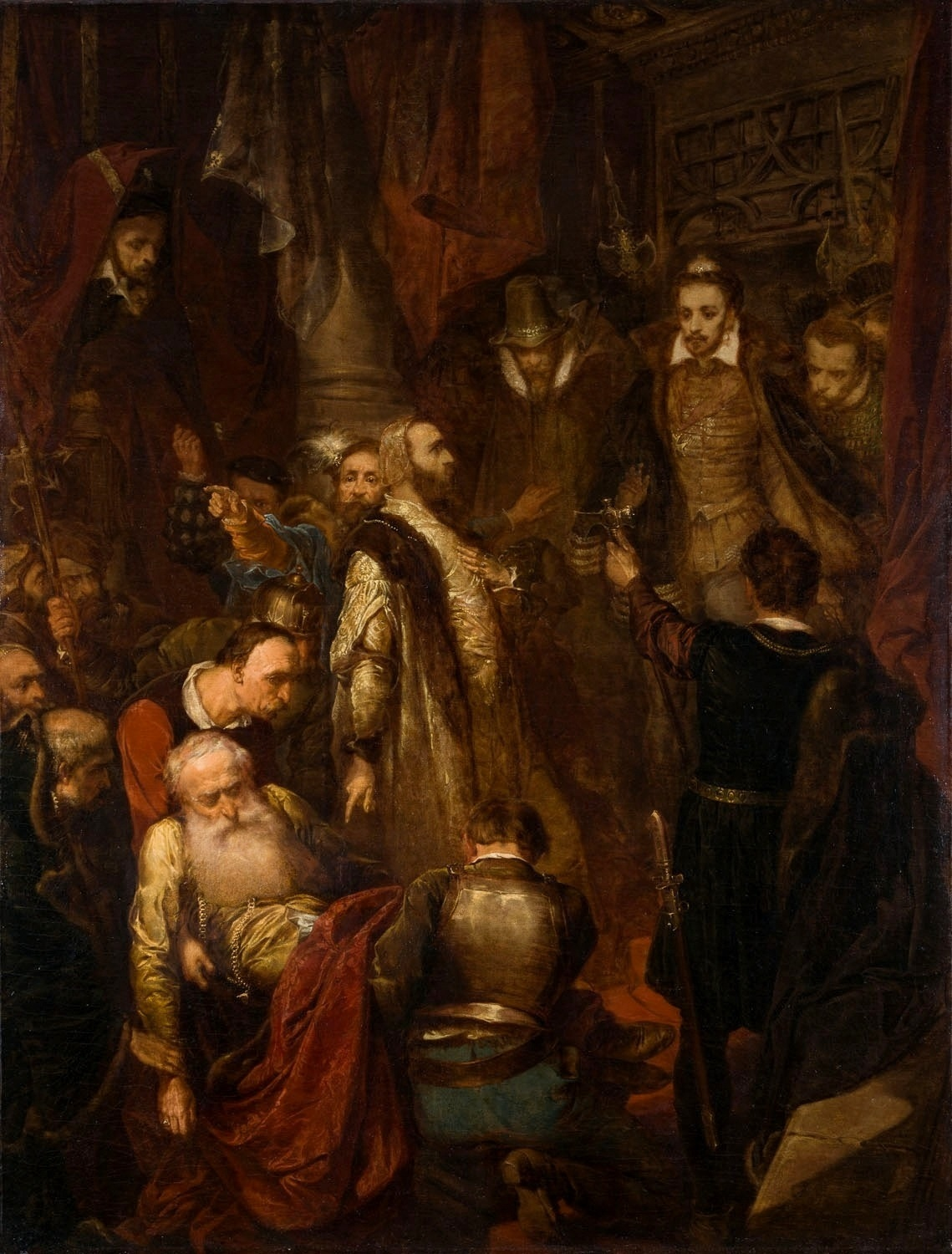
The Killing of Wapowski during the Coronation of Henry of Valois, by Matejko, 1861

Zborowski fled Poland even before the verdict was presented and joined the court of Stefan Batory, then the Prince of Transylvania. After several months Henry III renounced his kingship of Poland in favour of the kingship of France. Three years afterwards Batory was elected his successor. Zborowski returned to Poland, expecting that his brothers, some of the most notable supporters of Batory's candidacy, would raise to even greater fame and wealth after the new monarch arrived. However, most of the important offices were taken by the supporters of Jan Zamoyski and the Zborowski brothers gradually lost importance. This made them enemies of the new king and two of them, namely Andrzej and Krzysztof, started to plot with the courts of Moscow and Vienna against the life of the monarch. Samuel tried to rehabilitate himself by raising a Cossack regiment and taking part in the war against Muscovy and the Velikiye Luki (Wielkie Łuki) Campaign of 1580, where he proved to be a courageous warrior. However, the sentence was not changed and the Zborowskis received no reward or recognition for their efforts. Samuel then moved to Dzikie Pola region where he was a celebrity among the Cossacks; together they carried several raids against the Ottoman Empire, angering king Batory, who wanted to pursue a policy of appeasement with Ottomans.

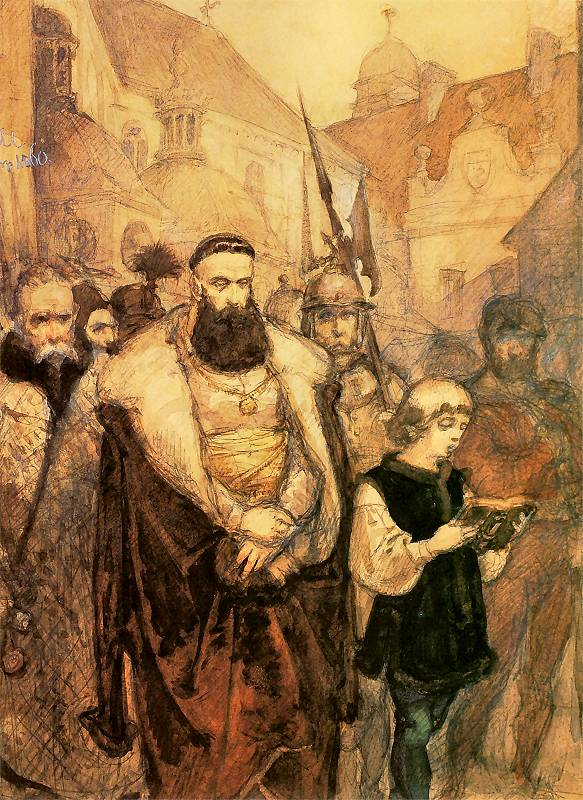
Samuel Zborowski on his way to his execution. Sketch by Jan Matejko

In 1584 Wojciech Długoraj, a notable composer and virtuoso lutenist in Zborowski's service who was maltreated by him, turned several incriminating letters written between the Zborowski brothers (Krzysztof and Samuel) to their enemy Jan Zamoyski. In these letters they described their preparations for the assassination of the king. Batory told Zamoyski that Zborowski should be executed; however as he had no power to issue such an order, Zamoyski would act on the basis of the 1574 banishment sentence. In May 1584 Zborowski entered the area of Lesser Poland (Małopolska), which was then under jurisdiction of Jan Zamoyski. He was arrested in Piekary and executed on 26 May 1584 at the Wawel hill by beheading. Długoraj was forced to flee to Germany for fear of Zborowski's heirs, who swore revenge.

Despite the fact that the execution was fully lawful, it was seen by many of the szlachta, most notably by the Protestants, as an act of vengeance or abuse of monarch power, a warning to the dangers of absolutism (especially pronounced given the power of Poland's nobility, amounting to a quasi-democracy). Zborowski would be remembered by many as a martyr.

Jastrzębiec coat of arms

His brothers moved to avenge him and tried to gain support from other nobles. At the November 1585 local sejmik, Krzysztof Zborowski and his men filled the church where the meeting was to take place (and where Zamoyski was to appear) and disrupted the proceedings with brandished weapons, openly calling for the other nobles to hand over Zamoyski. The proceedings were moved to the graveyard, where Zborowski proceeded to "filibuster" by ringing the church bell. Two different marshals were elected at the meeting, one by Zborowski's supporters and one by the opposition, and resolutions were only slowly passed, one of which asked the national Sejm to consider the legality of Zamoyski executing Zborowski.

Earlier that year, at the Sejm of January 1585 two of Zborowski's brothers were tried for their plans and Krzysztof was banished. During the proceedings, evidence against Krzysztof Zborowski amounted, including a letter in which he discussed killing the king. Bathory summoned Krzysztof to appear, but he did not. The second Zborowski was convicted of treason and sentenced to death. This finally broke the power of the once mighty family.

== In popular culture ==
In 1860, Samuel and Krzysztof were the subject of Aleksander Groza's 3-act play, Krzysztof Zborowski: A Drama in Three Scenes from the National History of 17th-Century Poland.

== See also ==
- Stanislaus of Szczepanów
- Zborowski family

== Sources ==
- Komuda, Jacek (2004). Warchoły i pijanice. Lublin: Fabryka Słów. ISBN 83-89011-40-9.
- "Zborowski Samuel". Internetowa encyklopedia PWN (in Polish). Wydawnictwo Naukowe PWN.
- "Zborowski Samuel". WIEM Encyklopedia (in Polish).
