= Piotr Zborowski =

Polish nobleman (died 1580)

Piotr Zborowski Palatine of Krakow
- Born: unknown
- Died: 13 September 1580
- Parent(s): Marcin Zborowski; Anna Konarska
- Relatives: Samuel Zborowski (brother); Krzysztof Zborowski (brother); Jan Zborowski (brother); Andrzej Zborowski (brother)

Piotr Zborowski (died 13 September 1580) was a Polish voivode (Polish: wojewoda) of Sandomierz (since 1568), palatine, voivode and starosta of Kraków (since 1574), castellan (kasztelan) of Biecz (since 1565) and castellan of Wojnicz (since 1567). He played an essential role in Polish–Lithuanian negotiations about elections of Henry of Valois and Stefan Bathory.

On November 18, 1575, during the Polish Interregnum, Zborowski gave a speech expressing his concern the Polish election. Two of the foremost candidates were from Muscovy and the House of Habsburg. Zborowski was against the election of both these candidates because he (along with many other Polish nobles), believed that these figures could be too powerful and become tyrannical, potentially stripping away the rights of the Golden Liberty that the nobles enjoyed.

However, Zborowski was also against the election of someone that could be too weak to rule Poland. Specifically, he wanted to ensure that the ruler could handle government with a certain degree of authoritativeness. Thus, he advocated for a prince or duke, far enough away that they could be driven from Poland by the nobility if they ever violated Polish laws, such as the Henrician Articles, which was the de facto constitution of the Commonwealth. Thus, the candidates he supported, the Duke of Ferrara and Stephen Bathory, met Zborowski's criteria of being a minor noble, yet still having enough wealth and strength to rule the kingdom effectively.

== See also ==
- Zborowski family

== Sources ==
- "Zborowski Piotr". Internetowa encyklopedia PWN (in Polish). Wydawnictwo Naukowe PWN.
