= Klenová Castle =

Castle in Bohemia

Coordinates: 49°19′55″N 13°13′43″E

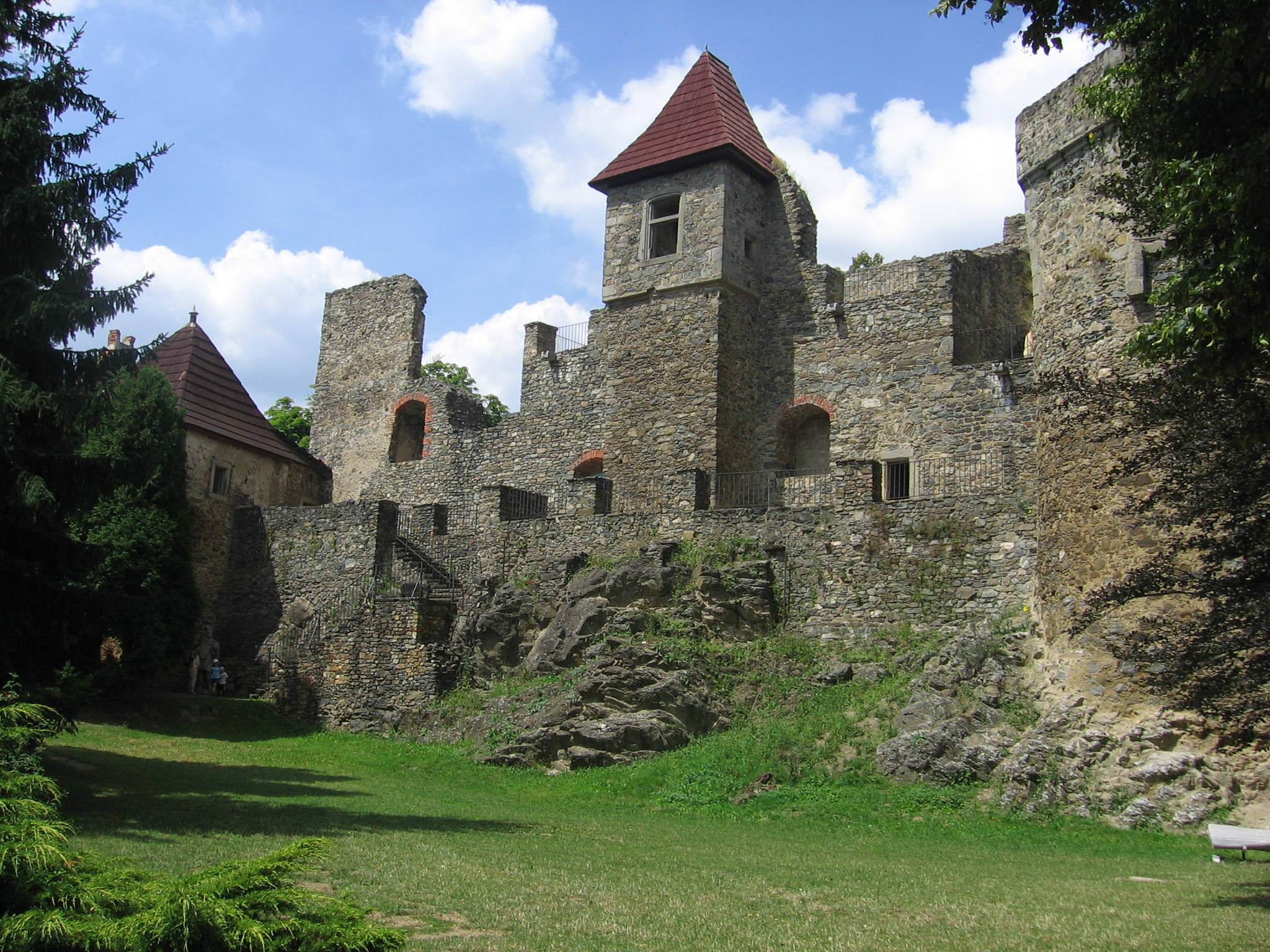
Klenová castle

Klenová castle (Czech: Hrad a zámek Klenová) is a large castle located in southwest Bohemia near the town of Klatovy. Only ruins remain from the original castle but buildings of a new chateau were added in the 19th century.

Klenová castle was built in 1291 as a part of the frontier defence system. Kryštof Harant z Polžic a Bezdružic, a writer and musician from the nobility, was born here in 1564. Between the 17th and 18th centuries the castle fell in ruins but it was reconstructed between 1832 and 1838. Today it hosts an art gallery.
