= Napoleon Baniewicz =

Polish-Lithuanian neurologist and psychiatrist (1904–1979)

- Baniewicz (Samogitian Branch) family coat of arms
- Born: 4 January 1904; Kowno, Russian Empire
- Died: 1979; Bydgoszcz, Polish People's Republic
- Known for: Neurology
- Spouse: Walentyna Lachowicz (m. 1930-1979)
- Children: Olgierd (1933–1986) Witold (1937–1998) Kazimierz (1944-)
- Scientific career
- Fields: Psychology, Neurology
- Thesis: [doi:10.1159/000128802 Die Achsenreflexe (Mittelflächenreflexe)] (1930)
- Doctoral advisor: Erwin Stransky

Napoleon Baniewicz (4 January 1904 – 1979) was a Polish–Lithuanian neurologist and psychiatrist. He was the first to describe a neurological symptom now known in neurology as the Baniewicz symptom. He was the founder of the neurological department of the Bydgoszcz Hospital and became a local celebrity.

== Early life and education ==
Napoleon Baniewicz was born to a Polonized and, as a result of the January Uprising, impoverished Lithuanian szlachta family, of the Jastrzębiec clan, as the eldest of four children of the eponymous Napoleon Baniewicz and his wife Maria Baniewicz (born Maria Citowiczówna) in Kowno, Kowno Governorate, then part of the Russian Empire. His father was the administrator of the noble estate of the aristocratic Tyszkiewicz family. Napoleon grew up in a Catholic and patriotic household at a time when there was no independent Polish state.

He attended Russian elementary school and graduated from the Polish Adam Mickiewicz Gymnasium in Kowno. In his early adult years, he worked to gather enough savings to enroll in the University of Vienna. With the help of a scholarship, he studied medicine. Among his professors were Otto Pözl, Emil Redlich, Erwin Stransky and Otto Marburg. From 1929 he worked as a volunteer in the neurological department and for the physician Josef Schaffner. During his time in Vienna he often met with fellow Poles and in such meetings he met his future wife, Walentyna Lachowiczówna that came from a wealthier szlachta family from Courland.

With a thesis on the etiology of epilepsy under prof. Stransky, Baniewicz received his doctorate on July 18, 1930, and would soon begin his career as a successful neurologist.

== Medical Career (1935–1979) ==
After his studies, he travelled to Poland. After settling in Wilno with his family, he became a medical assistant at the department of nervous and mental illnesses at Stefan Batory University, where he was invited to by his mentor, Stanisław Władyczko. During his time as medical assistant, he researched inflammations of the nervous system. In 1935 he became the head of the neurological department of the PKP Hospital in Wilno. From 1937 to 1939 he was also the head of the Sawicz Hospital, a town also located in the Wilno Voivodeship. Baniewicz had become a very influential figure in neurology, but his career was interrupted with the outbreak of World War II and the Soviet invasion of Poland. His city was occupied by the Red Army and then shortly given over to Lithuania, which was soon itself occupied by the USSR until the German attack on the USSR began in 1941.

After the war, Wilno was occupied by the Soviet Union, thus Baniewicz and his family had to leave their hometown. Napoleon Baniewicz settled in the Pomeranian city of Bydgoszcz, where he would resume his medical career. He founded the Department of Neurology in Bydgoszcz and became its first head in 1945. In the following years he established neurological departments in Włocławek, Świecie, Inowrocław, and Lipno as well and soon became a local celebrity.

As chairman of the Bydgoszcz branch of the Polish Neurological Society, he maintained contact with some of the most important neurologists in Poland. With his research, which he presented at neurological and psychiatric specialist congresses, he formed the Bydgoszcz School together with his students. Among other things, he set up a research laboratory with brain slices for research. He also campaigned for the establishment of a Medical Academy in Bydgoszcz, from which today's Ludwik Rydygier Medical Faculty in Bydgoszcz, which belongs to the Nicolaus Copernicus University in Toruń, emerged.

He was also at the Medical Academy in Warsaw, where he was appointed associate professor of medicine. However, he increasingly feuded with the communist leadership, which wanted him to resign, while his colleagues would have preferred to see him head his own independent neurological clinic in Bydgoszcz. Baniewicz eventually moved to another hospital in Bydgoszcz and withdrew from the public eye.

== Personal life ==
He was part of the Samogitia Corporation at the University of Vienna, which was made up of Lithuanian-Polish students.

Baniewicz married Walentyna Lachowicz from Kuldyga, Courland. The couple had three children; Olgierd (1933-1986), who became a surgeon and an Africa-traveler, Witold (1937-1998) who dedicated himself to Polonistics and journalism and wrote as a poet under the pseudonym Tomasz Wartki, and Kazimierz (1944-), who, like his father became a psychiatrist and a traveler as well.

Napoleon Baniewicz's wife, Walentyna was a veteran of the Home Army, which resisted against the occupation of Poland during World War II by German and Soviet forces, she died in the year 2001.

Napoleon Baniewicz dedicated most of his life to medicine and work. In the last five years of his life, he battled myeloma, from which he died in 1979 at the age of 75.

== Legacy ==
In total, he published 83 research papers during his lifetime. With his book The Axis Reflexes, which was published in 1964, he expanded his many years of research into the so-called axis reflexes. According to the famous Polish professor Eufemiusz Herman, Napoleon Baniewicz wrote his name into the history of neurology with his work that would be very important for the future development of neurology. The symptom described by Napoleon Baniewicz is known today as the Baniewicz Symptom.

As the founder of several neurological departments, he contributed to the common good of the cities of Bydgoszcz, Inowrocław and others.

== Thesis and Works ==
- Die Achsenreflexe (Mittelflächenreflexe). In: European Neurology. 149, 2004, S. 49–59, doi:10.1159/000128802.
- A new sternal reflex in cases of severe cerebral damage. In: British medical journal. Band 2, Nummer 5268, Dezember 1961, S. 1675–1678, doi:10.1136/bmj.2.5268.1675, PMID 13864669, PMC 1970838 (free full text).
