= Pecka =

- Market town
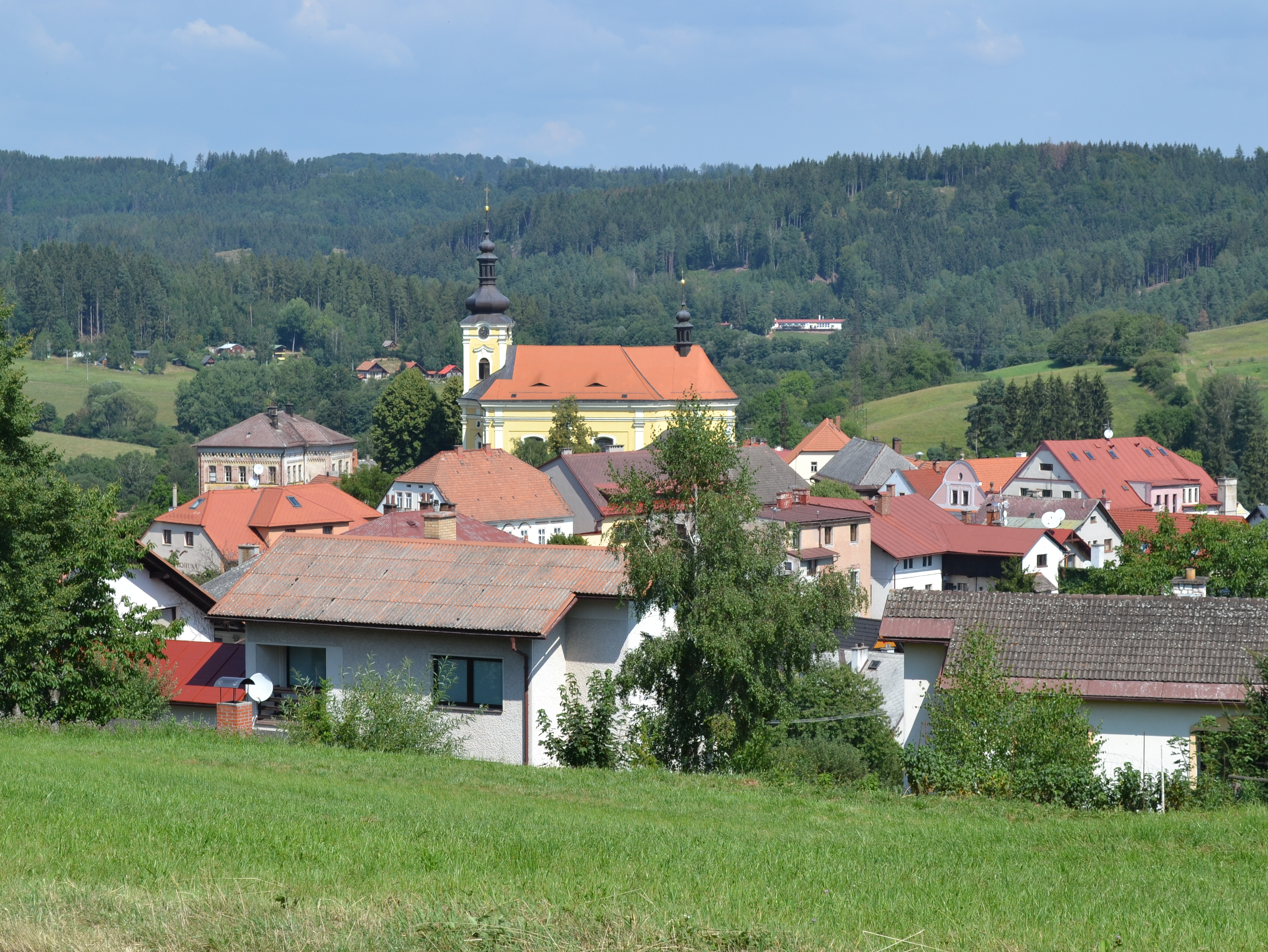
- View of Pecka

- Flag Coat of arms

- Location in the Czech Republic
- Coordinates: 50°29′54″N 15°36′27″E
- Country: Czech Republic
- Region: Hradec Králové
- District: Jičín
- First mentioned: 1322

Area
  - Total: 23.03 km^{2} (8.89 sq mi)
- Elevation: 407 m (1,335 ft)

Population (2026-01-01)
  - Total: 1,273
  - Density: 55.28/km^{2} (143.2/sq mi)
- Time zone: UTC+1 (CET)
  - Summer (DST): UTC+2 (CEST)
- Postal code: 507 82
- Website: www.mestys-pecka.cz

Pecka (Czech pronunciation: [ˈpɛtska]) is a market town in Jičín District in the Hradec Králové Region of the Czech Republic. It has about 1,300 inhabitants. The market town is located in the hilly landscape of the Giant Mountains Foothills and is known for the ruin of the Pecka Castle. The historic town centre with the castle ruin is well preserved and is protected as an urban monument zone.

== Administrative division ==
Pecka consists of eight municipal parts (in brackets population according to the 2021 census):

- Pecka (811)
- Arnoštov (17)
- Bělá u Pecky (188)
- Bukovina u Pecky (47)
- Horní Javoří (28)
- Kal (61)
- Staňkov (46)
- Vidonice (73)

== Etymology ==
The name Pecka means 'fruitstone' in Czech. It was originally the name of the local castle and referred to the solidity of the castle.

== Geography ==
Pecka is located about 18 kilometres (11 mi) east of Jičín and 33 km (21 mi) northwest of Hradec Králové. It lies in a hilly landscape in the Giant Mountains Foothills. The highest point is the hill Červený vrch at 541 m (1,775 ft) above sea level. The Javorka River flows next to the market town.

== History ==
The Pecka Castle was founded in the early 13th century. The first written mention of Pecka is from 1322, when a settlement started to grow below the castle. In 1382, it was promoted to a town. In the late 16th century, the Gothic castle was rebuilt to a Renaissance residence. The most famous owner of the castle was Kryštof Harant until his death in 1621. In 1830, the castle was burned down and turned into a ruin.

== Demographics ==
Historical population

Year	Pop.	±%
1869	3,511	—
1880	3,180	−9.4%
1890	3,090	−2.8%
1900	3,015	−2.4%
1910	3,195	+6.0%

Year	Pop.	±%
1921	2,763	−13.5%
1930	2,520	−8.8%
1950	1,882	−25.3%
1961	1,812	−3.7%
1970	1,572	−13.2%

Year	Pop.	±%
1980	1,485	−5.5%
1991	1,316	−11.4%
2001	1,283	−2.5%
2011	1,279	−0.3%
2021	1,271	−0.6%

Source: Censuses

== Transport ==
There are no railways or major roads passing through the municipality.

== Sights ==
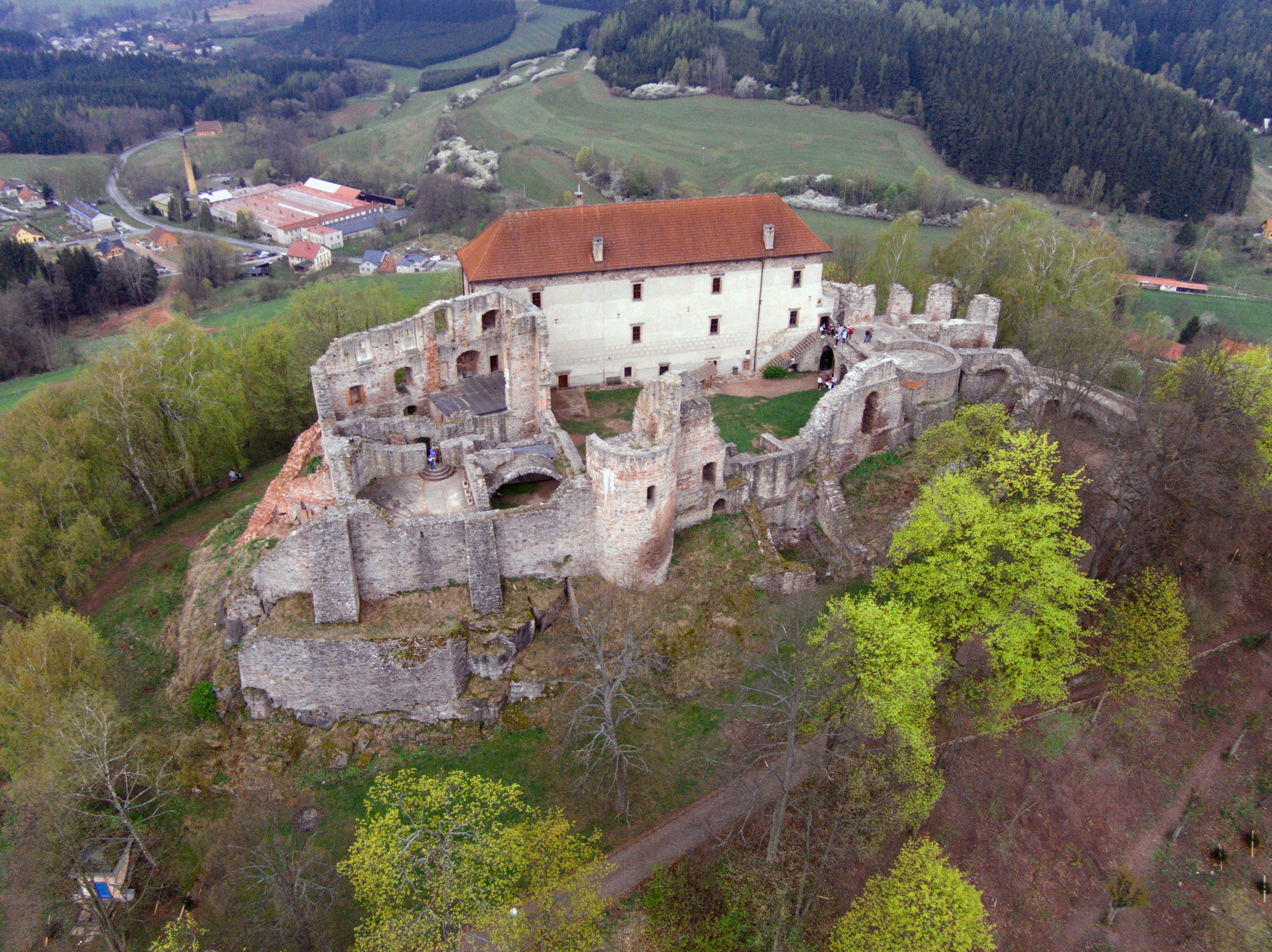
Pecka Castle

The Pecka Castle is open to the public and contains several expositions.

The Church of Saint Bartholomew was built by the Carthusians in 1751–1753, when it replaced an old stone church from 1603.
