= Zborowski (Jastrzębiec) =

Polish noble family

Jastrzębiec coat of arms of the Zborowski family

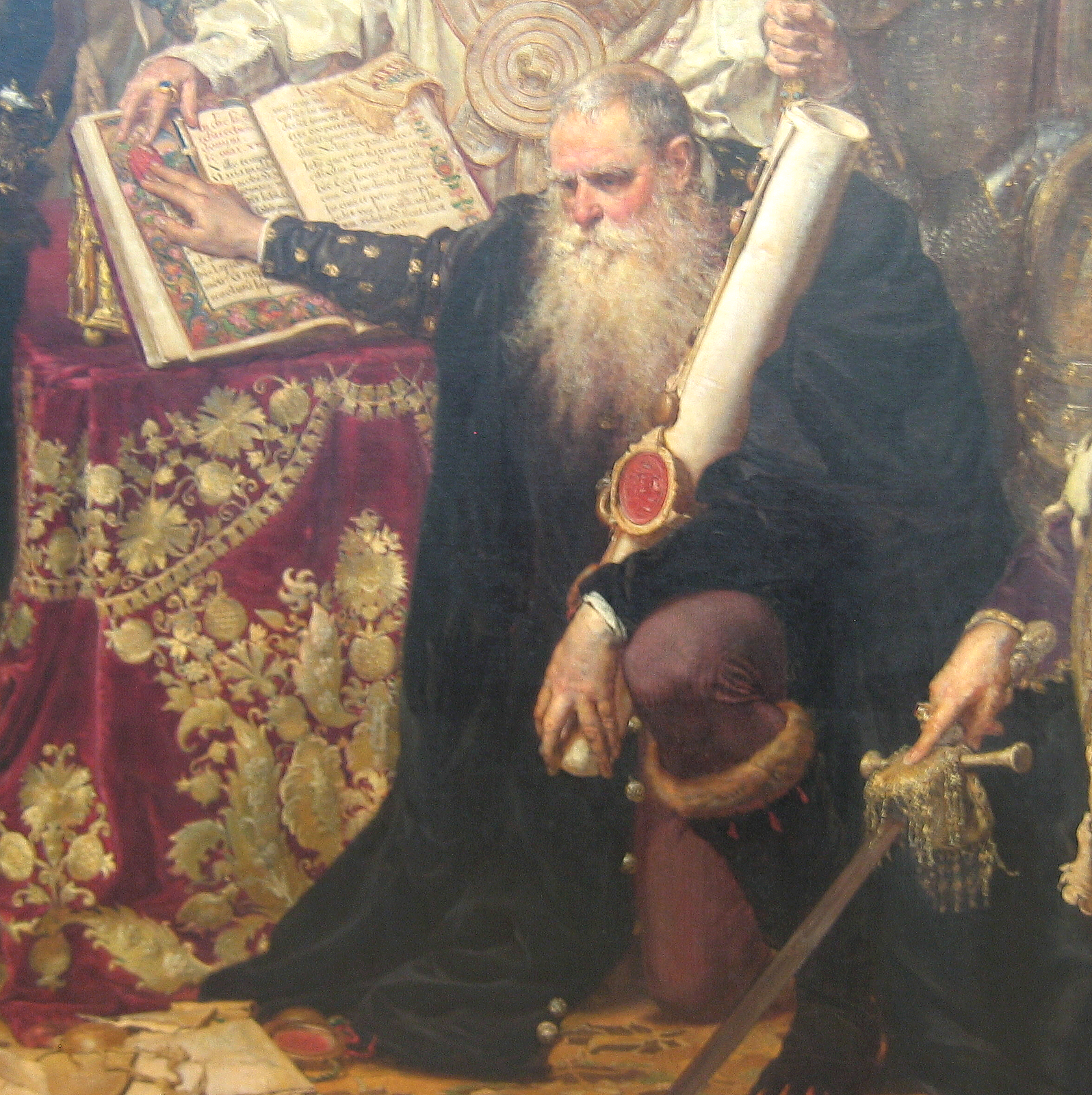
Marcin Zborowski

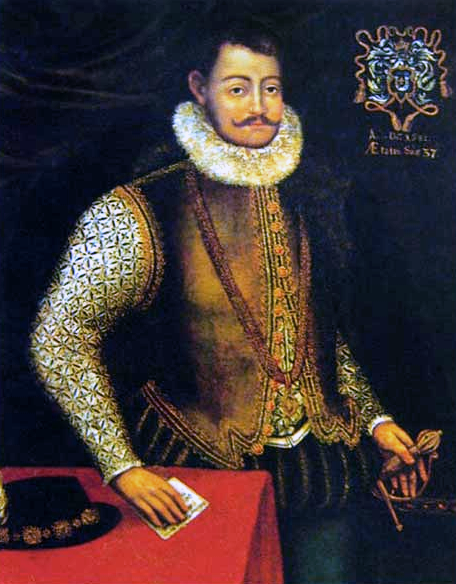
Andrzej Zborowski

Zborowski (feminine form: Zborowska, plural: Zborowscy) of the Jastrzębiec coat of arms was a Polish noble family from Greater Poland, It played a significant role in Polish politics in the 16th century.

The first known member of the family was Marcin Zborowski (1492-1565), castellan and voivode. The main line died out with his grandson, Aleksander Zborowski, in 1621.

The most notable events in the family's history revolve around their feud with Chancellor and Hetman Jan Zamoyski. Zamoyski's execution of Samuel Zborowski in 1584 caused much uproar in the Polish–Lithuanian Commonwealth and intensified the feud. It culminated in the military conflict of the War of the Polish Succession (1587–1588), which ended with Zamoyski's victory and Zborowski's loss.

== Coat of arms ==
The House of Zborowski used the Jastrzębiec coat of arms.

Coat of Arms of Counts Zborowski

== Notable members ==
=== "Main"-line ===
- Marcin Zborowski (died after 1488), starost of Odolanów and burgrave of Kraków
  - Andrzej Zborowski (died c. 1509), castellan of Żarnów, married Elżbieta Szydłowiecka h. Odrowąż
    - Marcin Zborowski (1492-1565), voivode of Kalisz and Poznań, married Anna Konarska z Góry h. Abdank
      - Marcin Zborowski (died 1599), castellan of Krzywin, married Urszula Rozdrażewska h. Doliwa
      - Piotr Zborowski (died 1580), voivode of Sandomierz and Kraków, married Barbara Myszkowska h. Jastrzębiec
      - Jan Zborowski (1538-1603), castellan of Gniezno, Hetman, married NN Maltzan, Elzbieta Pronska and Katarzyna Konarska h. Abdank
        - Elżbieta Zborowska (died before 1615), married voivode of Łęczyca Adam Sędziwój Czarnkowski h. Nałęcz and starost of Gniezno Piotr Opaliński h. Łodzia
        - Zofia Zborowska (died before 1618), married Abraham Sieniuta z Lachowic h. Sieniuta and castellan of Troki Jerzy Radziwiłł h. Trąby
      - Andrzej Zborowski (died 1598), Court Marshall of the Crown, married Barbara Jordan h. Trąby
        - Andrzej Zborowski (c. 1583-1630), Count of Melsztyn, castellan of Oświęcim, married Anna Trach z Brzezia
          - Marcin Deresław Zborowski (died 1639) courtier, married Jadwiga Padniewska
          - Krystyna Zborowska (died c. 1643), married voivode of Lublin and Sandomierz Jan Aleksander Tarło h. Topór
        - Marianna Zborowska (died before 1597), married castellan of Poznań Krzysztof Tuczyński h. Tuczyński
      - Krzysztof Zborowski (died 1593), podczaszy of the Crown
      - Samuel Zborowski (died 1584), Royal Rotmistrz, married Zofia Jordan h. Trąby
        - Aleksander Zborowski (died c. 1636), starost of Międzyrzecze, married Magdalena Fredro h. Bończa
          - Konstancja Zborowska z Rytwian, married castellan of Lwów Rafał Grochowski h. Junosza
        - Anna Zborowska, married voivode of Pomorze Ludwik Mortęski h. Mortęski
      - Katarzyna Zborowska (died 1587), married castellan of Sandomierz Hieronim Ossoliński h. Topór
      - Elżbieta Zborowska (died 1601), married Jan Amor Tarnowski h. Leliwa
      - Krystyna Zborowska (c. 1540-1588), married Hetman Jan Hieronim Chodkiewicz h. Kościesza
    - Piotr Zborowski (died 1553), krajczy and podczaszy of the Crown, castellan of Sandomierz
    - Zofia Zborowska (died 1545), married starost of Wieluń Stanisław Kurozwęcki h. Poraj and Royal secretary Hieronim Szafraniec z Piaskowej Skały h. Starykoń

=== "Count"-line ===
- Józef Ignacy Zborowski (born on the 17th century), married Juliana Fredro h. Bończa
  - Count Maksymilian Zborowski ze Zborowa (born c. 1730), owner of Wielopole, married Petronela Janota Bzowska h. Ostoja
    - Count Seweryn Maksymilian Zborowski ze Zborowa (1779–1846), owner of Dębowiec estates, married Franciszka Miroszewska h. Ślepowron
      - Count Prosper Maksymilian Zborowski ze Zborowa (1807–1872), owner of Dębowiec estates, married Emilia Wodzicka h. Wodzicki and Barbara Bobrowska h. Jastrzębiec
        - Count Jan Zborowski (1862–1914), owner of Zgłobice estates, married Helena Męcinska h. Poraj
          - Count Aleksander Zborowski (1901–1979), was owner of Partyń estates, married Maria Ziemińska and Zofia Tur Przedmirska h. Łuk
