= Kryštof Harant =

Czech nobleman, traveller, humanist, soldier, writer and composer

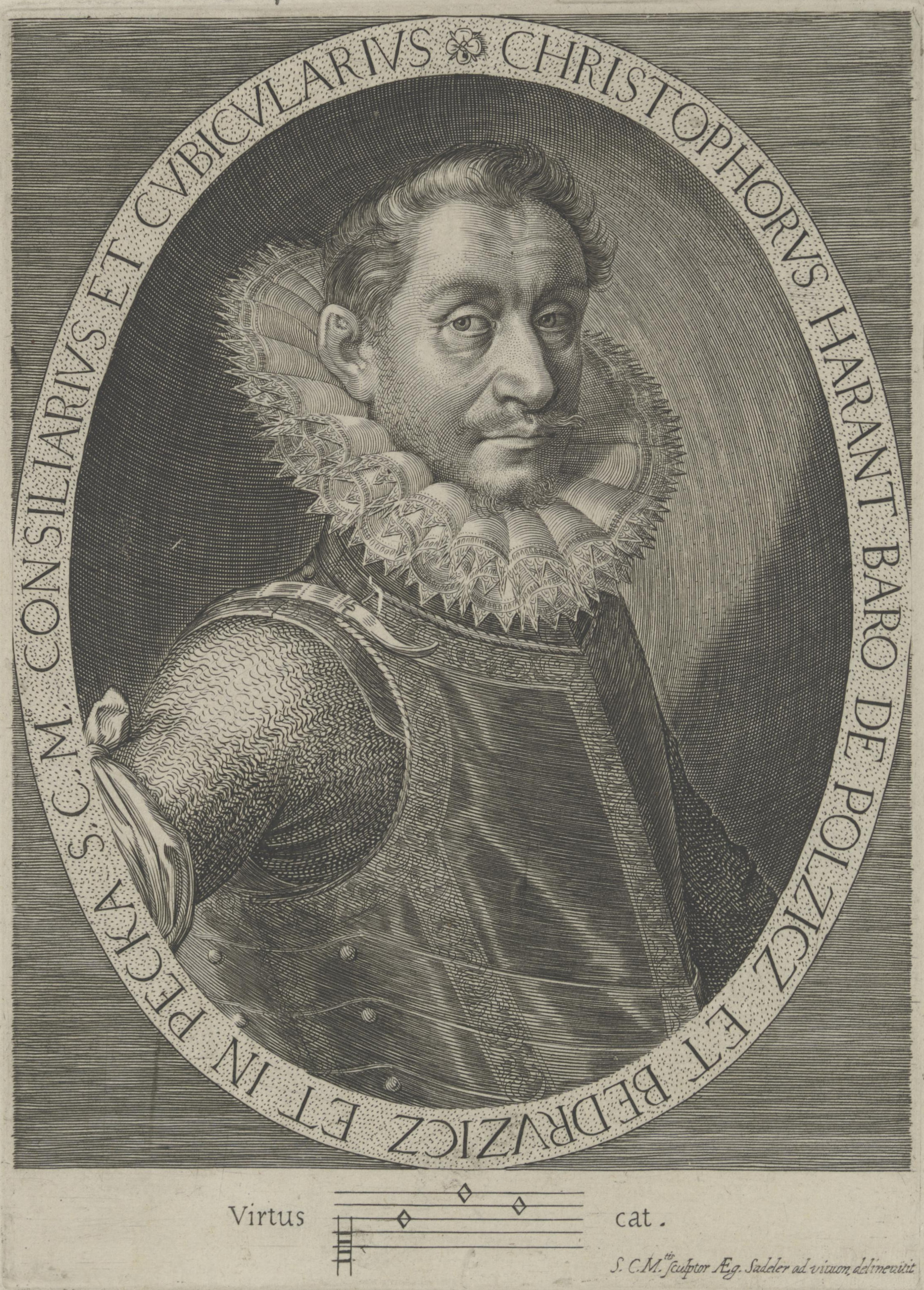
Portrait of Harant from the early 17th century by Aegidius Sadeler

Kryštof Harant of Polžice and Bezdružice (Czech: Kryštof Harant z Polžic a Bezdružic, 1564 – 21 June 1621) was a Czech nobleman, traveller, humanist, soldier, writer and composer. He joined the Protestant Bohemian Revolt in the Lands of the Bohemian Crown against the House of Habsburg that led to Thirty Years' War. Following the victory of Catholic forces in the Battle of White Mountain, Harant was executed in the mass Old Town Square execution by the Habsburgs.

As a composer he represented the school of Franco-Flemish polyphony in Bohemia. Harant is also noted for his expedition to the Middle East summarised in a travel book Journey from Bohemia to the Holy Land, by way of Venice and the Sea (1608).

== Life ==
Harant was born at Klenová Castle, near Klatovy, western Bohemia. From 1576 he studied singing and counterpoint as a member of a local court band at Innsbruck, at the court of Archduke Ferdinand II, learning 7 languages, discovering his talent for music and the other arts and his interest in history, geography and political science. He returned to Bohemia in 1584 in a vain attempt to get a post at the court of Rudolf II, and so enlisted as a soldier, participating in the 1593 and 1597 campaign against the Turks. In 1589 he married Eva Czernin von Chudenitz – they had two children before she died in 1597. Kryštof married two more times. Leaving his relation Lidmila Markvartová z Hrádku to raise the children, in 1598 and 1599 he went to the Holy Land as a pilgrim, wishing to visit the Holy Sepulchre with Eva's brother Hermann. He wrote about his experiences in a book entitled Journey from Bohemia to the Holy Land, by way of Venice and the Sea which was published in Prague in 1608.

After his return, in 1599, he was given a post in the emperor's court and simultaneously raised to the peerage, though both his children died that year. In 1601 he was made an advisor to the court of Rudolf and his successor Matthias and part of the imperial chambers. When the imperial court moved to Vienna, Harant was granted the Pecka Castle and dedicated himself for some years to music, becoming the most important Bohemian composer of the time. During 1614-15 he travelled to Spain with a diplomatic mission.

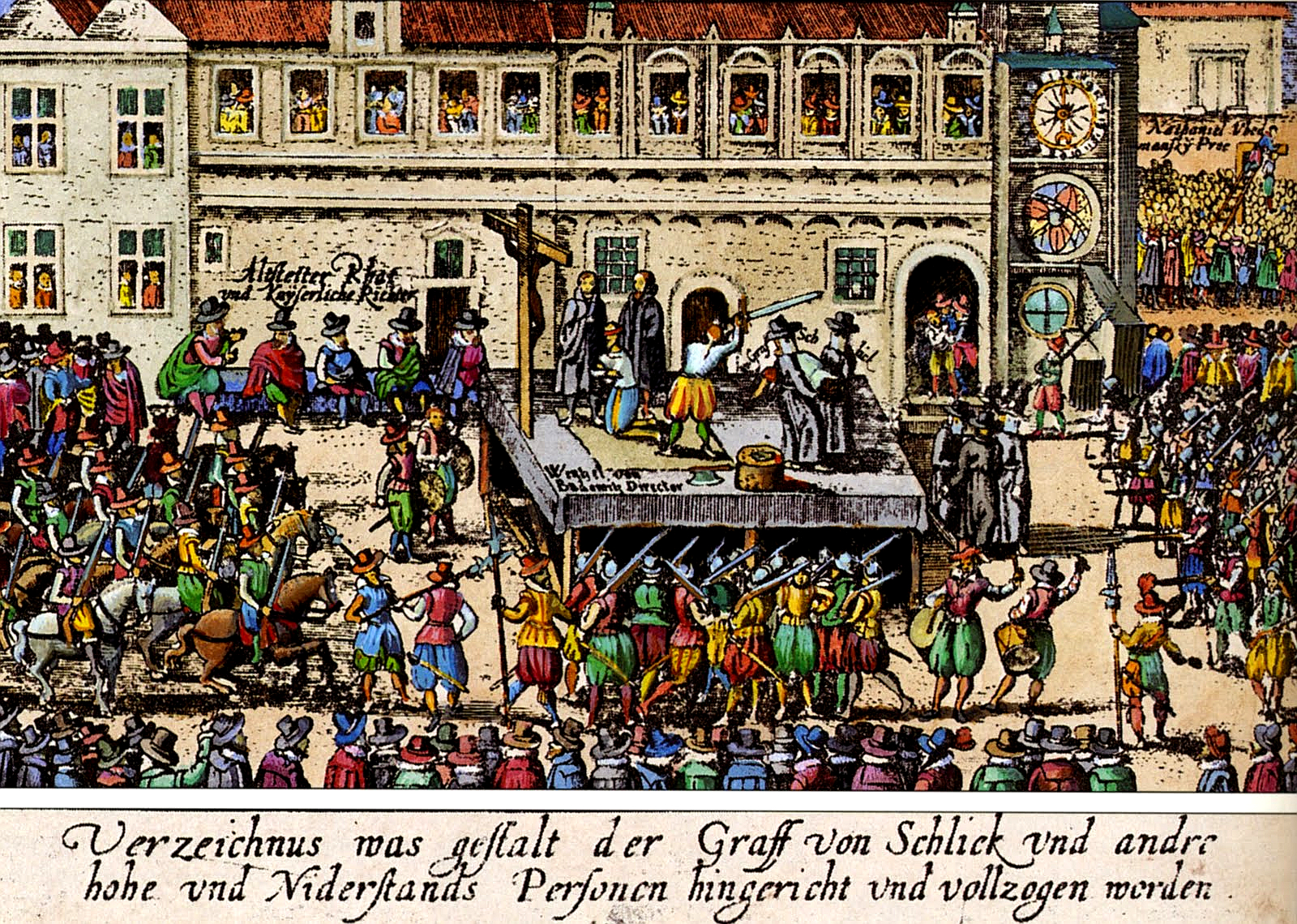
Old Town Square execution of 27 members of the Czech nobility by the Habsburgs

In 1618 he converted to Protestantism, returned to Prague, joined the forces arrayed against the Catholics as an artillery officer and fought on the side of the Bohemian states during the uprisings. In 1619 he became the commissioner of the military unit of Mladá Boleslav, Kouřim and Hradec Králové, and was involved in a 50,000 strong regiment in the unsuccessful march on imperial Vienna. During the rebellion he bombarded the imperial palace in Vienna—with the emperor inside—which proved to be a bad move.

After Frederick V succeeded to the Palatinate, he was appointed as a privy councillor and president of the Bohemian chamber, though this career was short-lived. After the defeat of the Protestant Czechs at the Battle of White Mountain in 1620 by the combined arms of Maximilian and Tilly, the subsequent sack of Prague by Imperial troops, and the assumption of office by the Emperor Ferdinand II, Harant withdrew to his castle. He was captured there by Albrecht von Wallenstein, arrested and taken to Prague, unsuccessfully pleading for mercy. As one of the twenty-seven Bohemian noble rebels, he was condemned to death and beheaded on 21 June 1621 by Jan Mydlář in the Old Town Square, Prague, along with all the other leaders of the insurrection.

His widow Anna Salomena (born von Horschitz, who had married Kryštof) in 1625 married Hermann Czernin von Chudenitz, Eva's brother.

== Music and influence ==
Harant's music was conservative, and in the style of the Netherlands composers of the previous generation. He used archaic techniques such as cantus firmus mass composition. Seven separate works survived, all sacred vocal compositions (the rest were lost when his property was confiscated as being that of an executed traitor). One of his pieces is a cantus firmus mass based on a madrigal by Marenzio (Missa quinis vocibus super Dolorosi martir)—a musical irony in that it combines a technique which went out of fashion a hundred years before with the music of one of Italy's most popular and progressive composers.

Harant had a reputation as a fine instrumentalist and singer in addition to being a composer. In another irony, one of his Roman Catholic masses was performed in 1620, just before his execution, in a Catholic church in Prague, to great ceremony.

== Musical works ==
- Missa quinis vocibus super Dolorosi martir – to the theme of madrigal by L. Marenzio "Dolorosi martir, fieri tormenti". The mass was published in 1905-6 by Czech musicologist Zdeněk Nejedlý.
- Motet Maria Kron, die Engel schon – for five voices, to the German text, 1604
- Motet Qui confidunt in Domino – for six voices, composed in Jerusalem, 1598

Fragments:

- Dejž tobě Pán Bůh štěstí – Czech wedding song
- Dies est laetitiae – an arrangement of a Christmas song for eight voices
- Motet Psallite Domino in cythara – for five voices
- Motet Qui vult venire post me – for five voices

The complete works of Kryštof Harant were published in 1956, by Czechoslovak publishing house KLHU.

== Literature ==
- Journey from Bohemia to the Holy Land, by way of Venice and the Sea (1608)
