= Jan (bishop of Wrocław) =

Polish bishop

Jan (Latin: Johannes) was the first bishop of Wrocław. He took power over the diocese of Wrocław at the time of its establishment in the year 1000. All numbering of the bishops dates from this time which is why he is not known as Jan I.

He had a brick cathedral built to replace an older wooden church, but this was destroyed in a pagan revolt in 1031, and the diocese ceased to function. The diocese was re-established in 1050 with Hieronim as Bishop.
