= Marcin Zborowski =

Polish castellan

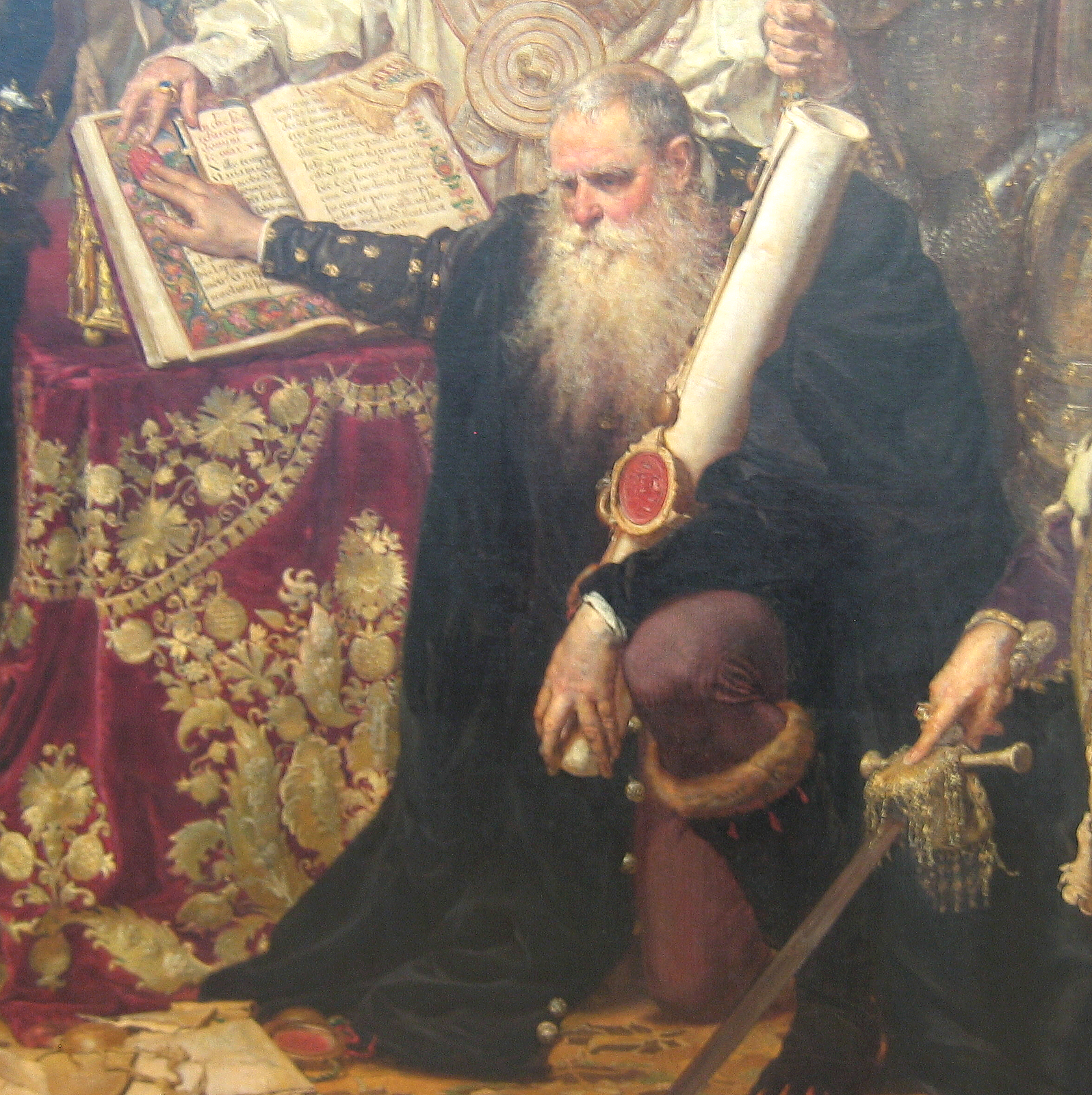
- Marcin Zborowski, part of the Union of Lublin painting by Jan Matejko, 1869
- Born: c. 1495
- Died: 25 February 1565
- Spouse: Anna Konarska
- Children: Samuel Zborowski; Jan Zborowski; Piotr Zborowski (d. 1580); Krzysztof Zborowski; Andrzej Zborowski; Krystyna Zborowska
- Parent(s): Andrzej Zborowski; Elżbieta z Szydłowieckich, Odrowąż coat of arms
- Relatives: Piotr Zborowski (brother; d. 1553)

Marcin Zborowski (c. 1495 – 25 February 1565) was a Polish castellan (Polish: kasztelan) of Kalisz (since 1543), voivod (wojewoda) of Kalisz (since 1550), voivod of Poznań (since 1558) and castellan of Kraków (since 1562). He was one of the leaders of the execution movement, co-initiator of the Chicken War (1537) and also supporter of the Reformation. Zborowski participated in the fourth war of the Muscovite-Lithuanian Wars (1512–1522) and in the Battle of Orsha (8 September 1514). Murderer of Dymitr Sanguszko (1554).

== See also ==
- Zborowski family
