= Krzysztof Zborowski =

Polish royal deputy cup-bearer

- Born: unknown
- Died: 1593
- Parent(s): Marcin Zborowski, Anna Konarska
- Relatives: Samuel Zborowski (brother); Jan Zborowski (brother); Andrzej Zborowski (brother)

Krzysztof Zborowski (died 1593) was a Polish Royal Deputy Cup-bearer of the Crown (Polish: podczaszy koronny; 1574–1576), supporter of the Habsburgs. In 1585 he was banished for conspiracy against Stephen Báthory of Poland.

== See also ==
- Zborowski family
