= Jan Zborowski =

Polish royal secretary

- Born: 19 December 1538
- Died: 25 August 1603 (aged 64); Odolanów
- Parent: Marcin Zborowski
- Relatives: Samuel Zborowski (brother); Krzysztof Zborowski (brother); Andrzej Zborowski (brother)

Jan Zborowski (19 December 1538 – 25 August 1603 in Odolanów) was a Polish Court Hetman of the Crown, royal secretary of king Sigismund II Augustus and Lord Castellan of Gniezno (since 1576).

Zborowski was a Lutheran and fought in the Danzig rebellion. He was a supporter of the Warsaw Confederation and an opponent of the Sandomierz Agreement.

== See also ==
- Zborowski family
