= Abraham ben Abraham =

Purported Polish nobleman

Abraham ben Abraham (Hebrew: אַבְרָהָם בֶּן אַבְרָהָם, lit. 'Abraham, son of Abraham') (c. 1700 – 23 May 1749), also known as Count Valentine (Valentin, Walentyn) Potocki (Pototzki or Pototski), was a Polish nobleman (szlachta) of the Potocki family who converted to Judaism and was burned at the stake by the Roman Catholic Church for apostasy. According to Jewish oral traditions, he was known to the revered Talmudic sage, the Vilna Gaon (Rabbi Elijah Ben Shlomo Zalman [1720–1797]), and his ashes were interred in the relocated grave of the Vilna Gaon in Vilna's new Jewish cemetery. Although the Orthodox Jewish community accepts the teachings about Abraham ben Abraham, including the involvement of the Vilna Gaon, secular scholars have so far concluded the story is apocryphal.

== Jewish traditions ==
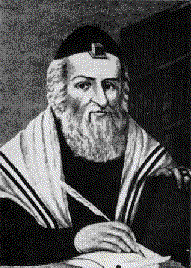
The Vilna Gaon (1720-1797) was, according to the Jewish tradition, a mentor to Abraham ben Abraham.

There are several versions of this story, especially among the Jews of Lithuania, Poland, and Russia, who know and still refer to Potocki as the Ger Tzedek ("righteous proselyte") of Vilna (Vilnius). Virtually all Jewish sources agree that he was a Polish nobleman who converted to Judaism and was burned at the stake by the Roman Catholic Church at Vilnius on 23 May 1749 (7 Sivan 5509, corresponding to the second day of the Jewish holiday of Shavuot in the Diaspora), because he had renounced Catholicism and had become an observant Jew.

There is also one contemporary written account from 1755, by Rabbi Yaakov Emden. ויקם עדות ביעקב דף כה, ב (Vayakam Edus b'Yaakov, 1755, p. 25b). A rough translation:

A few years ago, it happened in Vilna the capital of Lithuania that a great prince from the family of Pototska converted. They captured him and imprisoned him for many days thinking they could return him to their religion. He knew that he would not escape harsh tortures and a cruel death if he would not return. They wanted to save him from the death and punishment that would await him if he held out. He paid no attention to them or to the begging of his mother the countess. He was not afraid or worried about dying in all the bitter anguish they had done to him. After waiting for him for a long time, they tried to take it easy on him for the honor of his family. He ridiculed all the temptations of the priests who would speak to him every day because he was an important minister. He scorned them and laughed at them, and chose death of long and cruel agony, to the temporary life of this world. He accepted and suffered all from love, and died sanctifying God's name. May he rest in peace.

As to why there are few full sources, the Jewish view is reflected in this excerpt from the Shema Yisrael Torah Network website:

There are a few reasons why there are so few contemporary sources about the ger tzedek story. It can be assumed that the noble Pototzki family, which was a religious Polish-Catholic family, was not happy that one of their sons defected to Judaism. The Pototzki family was said to have generally dealt kindly with the Jews living on its lands. Mentioning the conversion would have been interpreted as an open provocation of the area's ruler, which would have not resulted in any good. In addition, undoubtedly the conversion of one of the upper-class gentiles aroused great interest among the populace, and his refusal to return to their faith caused them great embarrassment ... Nevertheless, we believe the words of our rabbis, which clearly indicate that there was a connection between the Gra (i.e. the Vilna Gaon) and the Ger Tzedek.

In his lecture on the topic, Prof. Sid Leiman quotes an author from a century ago who related the same reason - heard from a member of the Pototzki family.

== The traditional story ==
Polish author Józef Ignacy Kraszewski, based on the story written in Hebrew from 1766 by Judah Hurwitz, Ammudei Beit Yehuda in Amsterdam relates that young Potocki and his friend Zaremba, who traveled from Poland to study in a seminary in Paris, became interested in an old Jew whom they found poring over a large volume when they entered his wine shop. This Jew might have been their own countryman, Menahem Man ben Aryeh Löb of Visun, who was tortured and executed in Vilna at the age of seventy (3 July 1749). Tradition has brought this Jewish martyr into close connection with the Ger Tzedek, but fear of the censor has prevented writers in Russia from saying anything explicit on the subject. His teachings and explanations of the Old Testament, to which they, as Roman Catholics, were total strangers, so impressed them that they prevailed upon him to instruct them in the Hebrew language. In six months they acquired proficiency in the Biblical language and a strong inclination toward Judaism. They resolved to go to Amsterdam, which was one of the few places in Europe at that time where a Christian could openly embrace Judaism. But Potocki first went to Rome, whence, after convincing himself that he could no longer remain a Catholic, he went to Amsterdam and took upon himself the covenant of Abraham, assuming the name of Avraham ben Avraham ("Abraham the son of Abraham"; "the son of Abraham" is the traditional styling of a convert to Judaism, as Abraham was the first who converted to Judaism from polytheism).

Potocki's parents got word of his leave from the seminary in Paris and the rumors that he had converted to Judaism and began searching for him. Potocki then fled from France and hid in a synagogue in Vilna, wearing a long beard and peyot like the Perushim (devout Jews who separated themselves from the community to learn and pray). When the Vilna Gaon heard of his whereabouts, he advised him to hide instead in the small town of Ilye (Vilna Governorate). There a Jewish tailor who sewed uniforms for Polish bureaucrats overheard some clients talking about the fugitive divinity student and suspected that the stranger in the synagogue might be he. Later this tailor's son, who liked to disturb the men studying in the synagogue, was sharply rebuked by Potocki; some say Potocki grabbed the boy by the ear and pulled him out the door. The tailor reported him to the Bishop of Vilna, and Potocki was arrested. His parents visited him in prison and begged him to renounce his Judaism publicly, promising to build him a castle where he could practice the religion privately. According to Rabbi Ben-Zion Alfes, the Maggid of Vilna, Potocki refused his mother, saying, "I love you dearly, but I love the truth even more".

After a long imprisonment and a trial for heresy, Potocki was condemned to death by being burned alive at the stake. After the decree was handed down, the Vilna Gaon sent Potocki a message offering to rescue him using Kabbalah. Potocki refused, preferring instead to die al kiddush Hashem and inquired of the Vilna Gaon which blessing he should make immediately before his death. The Vilna Gaon answered, "...m'kadesh es Shimcha be'rabbim" (Who sanctifies His Name in public) and sent Alexander Süsskind of Grodno as an emissary to hear and answer "Amen". His mother used all her influence to procure a pardon for him, but the execution was moved up one day so that she would not be able to deliver it in time.

Potocki was executed in Vilna on the second day of the Jewish holiday of Shavuot. It was unsafe for any Jew to witness the burning; nevertheless, one Jew, Leiser Zhiskes, who had no beard, went among the crowd and succeeded by bribery in securing some of the ashes of the martyr, which were later buried in the Jewish cemetery. Potocki walked proudly to the execution site, singing a song that was later sung in the Volozhin yeshiva and that was also sung by Rabbi Isser Zalman Meltzer after Yom Kippur. Some sources say that Rabbi Alexander Ziskind, author of Yesod VeShoresh HaAvodah, stood near Potocki and said "Amen" to the blessing he said before he died.

Following Potocki's execution, the town that had furnished the firewood for the execution burned down. There was also an unusual number of fires in Vilna, and a building that stood opposite the execution site bore a black stain from the "smoke and fumes of the burning". No amount of paint or whitewashing would remove the stain, and finally, the building was taken down. The authorities would not allow a monument to be erected over Potocki's ashes, but a "strange tree" grew at the site. Those who tried to cut down the tree were mysteriously injured in the process. Around 1919 a tomb was erected over the ashes and Jews came to pray there. Following the destruction of the old cemetery of Vilna by the Nazis during World War II, a new cemetery was built and the Vilna Gaon was interred in a new ohel. Potocki's ashes were reinterred alongside the Vilna Gaon's grave, and an inscribed stone memorial to him was mounted on the wall of the ohel.

Potocki's comrade Zaremba returned to Poland several years before him, married the daughter of a great nobleman, and had a son. He remained true to the promise to embrace Judaism and took his wife and child to Amsterdam, where, after he and his son had been circumcised, his wife also converted to Judaism; they then went to the Land of Israel.

According to Rabbi Shlomo Zalman Auerbach, following Avraham ben Avraham's death, the Vilna Gaon believed that the spiritual constitution of the world had become altered in such a way that a Jew was no longer bound to wash his hands in the morning (netilat yadayim) within four amot (cubits) of his bed, as explicitly taught in the codes of Jewish law such as the Shulchan Aruch and other halachic works. Rather, a Jew's entire house would be considered as four amot for this mitzvah. This custom, begun at Avraham ben Avraham's death, commenced with the Vilna Gaon and later became the practice of the Volozhin and Slabodka yeshivas in Europe, becoming today the routine of many leading Israeli rabbis who follow the traditions of the Gaon.

== Lack of historical evidence ==
Many secondary sources – encyclopaedias of Jewish culture, history and religion – include an entry on Potocki, a Polish magnate and member of the powerful Potocki family, who converted to Orthodox Judaism in 18th-century Netherlands and who, after his return to Vilna, was tried by an Inquisition court which sentenced him to burning at the stake. Historians (ex. Janusz Tazbir, Jacek Moskwa, Rimantas Miknys and Magda Teter) who have studied the story of Potocki, however, believe it to be invented, although it is unknown when or by whom (Moskwa points to a possibility that the author was Kraszewski himself, who is known to have invented some tales he claimed were true). Teter mentioned that the story ("a carefully crafted tale of conversion") was likely created and developed as a "response to a number of challenges that the Polish Jewish community faced from the mid-eighteenth century".

=== Tazbir (2003) ===
Polish historian Janusz Tazbir asserted that the story—he uses the term "legend"—originated at the turn of the 19th century and was published in a Jewish periodical issued in London as "The Jewish Expositor and Friend of Israel" (vol. 8, 1822). He notes that the literary version of the legend was created by Józef Ignacy Kraszewski, a well-known Polish writer of the 19th century, author of numerous historical novels, who included the story about Potocki in the third volume of the history of Vilna (1841), Wilno od początków jego do roku 1750 (1840–1842), in which he claims to have followed a Hebrew original, thought by some to be from Ammudei Beit Yehudah (Judah Hurwitz, Amsterdam 1766). (However, Ammudei Beit Yehudah contains no reference to this story other than a brief mention of the execution of the elderly Rabbi Mann in Wilno). The story was then popularised through Russian translations, and there is evidence that a cult of Potocki's grave in Vilna has existed until the Jewish cemetery (at Pióromont also known as Snipiszki quarter) was destroyed by Nazis during World War II and later by the Soviets. Some sources claim his remains were rescued along with those of Vilna Gaon, though it is said that there is no modern monument or grave clearly identified as Potocki's in Vilna or elsewhere. However, historian Sid Leiman has identified what he thinks is a likely Potocki's grave by examination of the gravestones near the Vilna Gaon's.

Tazbir stated that the tragic fate of Potocki, passed through Jewish oral tradition, remains unconfirmed by 18th-century Polish or Jewish primary sources and that there is no evidence in any archives or genealogy tree that Potocki existed. Tazbir further notes that the Polish nobility was guaranteed the freedom of faith (by acts like Neminem captivabimus and the Warsaw Confederation), and capital punishment was extremely rare. (though see also Iwan Tyszkiewicz). He observes that the incident, if real, should have caused an uproar among the Polish nobility (like an earlier and well-documented case of the execution of Samuel Zborowski), and would be the only historical example of execution by burning of a nobleman – yet no contemporary source from the Polish–Lithuanian Commonwealth mentions this event even in a passing reference. In addition, it is difficult to believe that the death at the stake of a Polish aristocrat, from one of the most powerful Polish magnate families, charged with a religious crime, was not echoed in any of the diaries or polemical writings concerning religion and tolerance, topics in which the Polish nobility, and the entire European Enlightenment, were particularly interested. Tazbir has concluded that "the court trial and death of Walentyn Potocki should be recognised as a historical legend deprived of all source–material foundations".

It is worth noting that given that the story was quoted in a written account from 1755, by Rabbi Yaakov Emden (Vayakam Edus b'Yaakov, 1755, p. 25b), Tazbir's claim that the "legend" originated at the turn of the 19th century, is clearly false.

=== Similar story of Abraham Isacowicz ===
Some have suggested that the Potocki legend is an embellishment of a different story. A report published in the July 1753 edition of The London Magazine describes the story of a very similar execution. The correspondent dated his report 11 June, two days after the end of the Shavuot holiday. It describes "an apostate named Raphael Sentimany, a native of Croatia", who converted to Judaism at the age of 12 and adopted the name Abraham Isacowicz. The report describes his imprisonment and execution in Wilno as the Potocki legend describes. The report also states that he was executed on 9 June, which was the second day of Shavuot, just as in the Potocki story. The only important differences between the Sentimany execution and the Potocki legend are that the martyr's Jewish surname was Isacowicz, called Rafael Sentimany rather than Valenty Potocki, was killed in 1753 rather than 1749, and that he was a Croatian immigrant rather than a Polish noble. Raphael Sentimany is also mentioned in the anonymous British work "Admonitions from the Dead, in Epistles to the Living", published in 1754, in a manner suggestive of the wide exposure of the original report of Abraham ben Abraham's execution.

== Sources ==
=== Jewish ===
- The Incredible Story of the Righteous Convert of Vilna by Rabbi Menachem Levine
- "Al Kiddush Hashem: R' Avrohom Ben Avrohom" by Rabbi Dov Eliach)
- "Who is buried in the Vilna Gaon's tomb?" by Professor Sidney Z. Leiman
- "The Haskalah Movement in Russia", by Jacob S. Raisin, 1913 (2005 Project Gutenberg eBook)
- Prouser, Joseph H. (2005). Noble Soul: The Life and Legend of the Vilna Ger Tzedek Count Walenty Potocki. Gorgias Press LLC. ISBN 1-59333-097-9.
- "The Ger Tzedek of Wilno (5509)" by Nissan Mindel

=== Modern ===
- Janusz Tazbir, The Mystery of Walentyn Potocki, Kwartalnik Historyczny, 3/2003, online abstracts from that issue
- (in Polish) Jacek Moskwa, Legenda Sprawiedliwie Nawróconego: Historia zatajona czy zmyslona?, Zwoje 3/31, 2002, online original in Polish
- Magda Teter, "The Legend of Ger Zedek of Wilno as Polemic and Reasurance," AJS Review 29 no. 2(2005), 237-263 full text article at www.COJS.org
- The Ger Tzedek of Vilna - Fact or Fiction (8 June 2005) by Professor Sidney Z. Leiman

=== Historic ===
- Fuenn, Kiryah Ne'emanah, p. 120, Wilna. 1860
- Gersoni, The Converted Nobleman, in Sketches of Jewish, Life and History, pp. 187–224, New York, 1873
- Judah ben Mordecai Ha-Levi Hurwitz, 'Ammude bet Yehudah, p. 46a, Amsterdam, 1766
- Kraszewski, Józef Ignacy, 'Wilno od poczatkow jego do roku 1750', 1841 (Russian translation: Yevreyskaya Biblioteka, iii., pages 228-236')hy
- B. Mandelstamm, Chazon la-Mo'ed, p. 15, Vienna, 1877

=== Fiction ===
- Sabaliauskaite, Kristina, Silva rerum III. A novel, Vilnius, Baltos Lankos, 2014.
