= Ben-Zion =

Ben-Zion (Hebrew: בֵּן־צִיּוֹן, romanized: Ben-Tsiyyon, lit. 'Son of Zion') is a Hebrew given name. Alternative spellings in English include Ben Zion, Benzion, and Bension. It may refer to the following people:

== Given name ==
- Ben Zion Abba Shaul (1924–1998), rosh yeshiva, Porat Yosef Yeshiva
- Ben-Zion Alfes (1851–1941), rabbi
- Ben-Zion Ben-Yehuda, birth name of Itamar Ben-Avi (1882–1943), first native speaker of Modern Hebrew as the son of Eliezer Ben-Yehuda; journalist and Zionist activist
- Benzion Judah Berkowitz (1803–1879), Hebrew scholar
- Ben-Zion Bokser (1907–1984), American Conservative rabbi
- Ben-Zion Dinur (1884–1973), Israeli politician
- Bentsion Fleishman (born 1923), Russian mathematician
- Benzion Freshwater (born 1948), British property investor
- Ben-Zion Gold (1923–2016), American rabbi
- Ben Zion Goldberg (1895–1972), American journalist
- Ben-Zion Gopstein (born 1969), Israeli radical right-wing activist
- Ben Zion Aryeh Leibish Halberstam (born 1955), fifth Bobover Rebbe
- Ben Zion Halberstam (1874–1941), second Bobover Rebbe
- Ben-Zion Halfon (1930–1977), Israeli politician
- Benzion Halper (1884–1924), Lithuanian-American Hebraist and Arabist
- Ben-Zion Harel (1892–1972), Israeli doctor and politician
- Benzion Hoffman (1874–1954), Yiddish writer
- Ben Zion Hyman (1891–1984), Canadian Jewish bookseller
- Aaron Ben-Zion ibn Alamani, 12th century Egyptian judge
- Ben-Zion Keshet (1914–1984), Israeli politician
- Benzion Klatzko (born 1968), American rabbi, university professor, founder of the largest Jewish social network
- Bension Kohen (died 1999), rabbi
- Ben-Zion Leitner (c. 1927–2012), Israeli soldier, received highest military decoration during the 1948 Arab–Israeli War
- Benzion Miller (1947–2025), Polish-born American cantor
- Bentsion Monastyrsky, Soviet cinematographer
- Ben Zion Moshel (born 1993), Israeli footballer
- Benzion Netanyahu (1910–2012), Israeli historian, father of Israeli Prime Minister Benjamin Netanyahu
- Ben-Zion Orgad (1926–2006), Israeli composer
- Benzion Rakow (1925–1985), British rabbi
- Ben-Zion Rubin (born 1939), Israeli politician
- Ben Zion Shenker (1925–2016), American composer and hazzan
- Ben Zion Solomon, American-born Israeli musician
- Ben-Tzion Spitz (born 1969), Chief Rabbi of Uruguay
- Ben-Zion Sternberg (1894–1962), Zionist leader
- Ben Zion Tavger (1930–1983), Israeli activist
- Ben-Zion Meir Hai Uziel (1880–1953), Sephardic Chief Rabbi of Mandatory Palestine and of Israel
- Benzion Yadler (1871–1962), rabbi
- Ben-Zion Weinman (1897–1987) American painter, sculptor, poet and a dramatist
- Ben-Zion Witler (1907–1961), Jewish singer, actor, coupletist, comedian and composer

== Surname ==
- Ariel Bension (1880–1932), writer
- S. Ben Zion (1870–1932), pen name of Simha Alter Guttman, Hebrew writer, educator, newspaper editor, publisher, co-founder of Tel Aviv
- Yehoshua Ben-Zion (1924–2004), Israeli banker

== See also ==
- Zion (disambiguation)
