= Counter-Reformation in Poland =

The Counter-Reformation in Poland (Polish: Kontrreformacja w Polsce) was the response (Counter-Reformation) of Catholic Church in Poland (more precisely, the Kingdom of Poland until 1568, and thereafter the Polish–Lithuanian Commonwealth) to the spread of Protestantism in Poland (the Protestant Reformation). Counter-Reformation in Poland lasted from the mid-16th century until the mid-18th century and ended with the victory of the Catholic Church, which succeeded in significantly reducing the influence of Protestantism in Poland.

== History ==
Religious denominations in Poland–Lithuania in 1573

Religious denominations in Poland–Lithuania in 1750

Poland emerged as one of the main terrains of struggle between the Protestant Reformation movement and the Catholic Church's Counter-Reformation. Lutheranism was popular among German-descent townsfolk, and Calvinism among the nobility. A year after Luther made his theses public, they were preached in Danzig (Gdańsk), and soon spread over West Prussia province of Poland. From there Protestantism spread to East Prussia, Greater Poland, Lesser Poland and other Polish provinces, as well as Grand Duchy of Lithuania. In 1573 the Protestants, commanding a majority in the Sejm (parliament), scored a major political victory by passing a law of religious tolerance, the Warsaw Confederation. Towards the end of the 16th century, it can be estimated (through the number of parishes) that about a seventh of the Christian population in the Polish–Lithuanian Commonwealth were Protestant. In the 16th century, Poland was a haven for many refugees fleeing persecution from less tolerant parts of Europe, harboring not only Catholics and Protestants, but also people of Orthodox, Judaic and even Muslim faiths.

Soon after the words of Reformation reached Poland in the first half of the 16th century, Catholic authorities such as primate of Poland Jan Łaski and bishop and vice-chancellor Piotr Tomicki began issuing edicts condemning this movement, and garnered royal support for this course of action. In the second half of the century, key Polish counter-reformation figures included cardinal Stanislaus Hosius. bishop and royal secretary Martin Kromer, primate Stanisław Karnkowski and Jesuits Piotr Skarga and Jakub Wujek. Key dates and events marking the beginning of counter-reformation in Poland were the establishment of the regular papal nunciature mission in 1555 (beginning with the arrival of Luigi Lippomano), arrival of the Jesuit order in 1564, and the synod of Piotrków's acceptance of the Decrees of Trent in 1577.

At first the agents of Counter-Reformation in Poland focused on persuasion, though they also relied heavily on legal discrimination, particularly the anti-Reformation royal decrees of Sigismund I of Poland. The Catholic Church in Poland succeeded in subordinating the Eastern Orthodox Church through the Union of Brest-Litovsk (1595–1596). Jesuit schools gained significant renown at that time. From the 17th century, agents of Counter-Reformation became increasingly intolerant, succeeding in introducing censorship, including the Index Librorum Prohibitorum. Some Protestant denominations were banned, while others lost many churches and adherents. Construction of non-Catholic churches was banned in 1632. The pacifist Polish Unitarians (Polish Brethren) were expelled from Poland in 1658 for refusing to aid the country in the time of military need. In 1668 the Sejm made it illegal for Catholics to convert to another faith; in 1673 non-Catholics were forbidden to be ennobled. By the first half of the 18th century, Protestants were barred from most civil offices, including being elected to the Sejm.

Nonetheless, compared to many other European countries, the conflict between the Catholics and the Protestants was relatively peaceful. Non-Catholics were rarely sentenced to death for their beliefs; the most common punishments were fines or exile. Polish historian Janusz Tazbir coined a phrase "state without stakes", illustrating that the level of religious persecution and conflict in Poland was much lower than in most other European countries of that time, a fact that can be attributed to Protestant success in passing laws providing for religious toleration in the 16th century, and later, to the weakness of the Polish central state, which the resurgent Catholics were unable to use to implement more violent methods of conversion or reconversion (such as burning at the stake). Many Protestant nobles converted back to Catholicism to increase their chances of receiving favorable positions from Catholic-leaning monarchs; others did so to prove that they were "patriots".

Many scholars agree that "Poland was one of the great successes of the Counter-Reformation" and cite Counter-Reformation in Poland as the main instance where the Roman Catholic Church successfully reversed gains of the Reformation. Others, however, such as Norman Davies, suggest that the triumph of the Counter-Reformation might have been exaggerated, and that at the very least not all Protestants were reconverted, nor was this the case with other denominations such as Eastern Orthodox.

Counter-Reformation ended with the Repnin Sejm of 1768, which abolished legal discrimination against religious dissidents. Following further reforms at the Partition Sejm in 1773, the political rights of the remaining non-Catholics in the Commonwealth were largely restored, half a century or so before similar concessions were granted to Catholics in Protestant countries like Britain (1829) or Sweden (1849).

== Reasons for success ==
Success of the Counter-Reformation in Poland can be attributed to the vigorous activities of the Jesuits and other monastical orders, and to the fact that the Polish kings of that period were primarily Catholic, and leaned towards either neutrality or clear support for the Counter-Reformation policies. Protestantism, too often treated instrumentally by the elites, also failed to find significant followings among the masses of Polish peasantry. Lutheranism remained closely associated with German-speaking burghers, and the mid-17th century wars with Protestant Sweden also contributed to the rejection of Protestant identity by the Polish nobility, as many Protestants allied themselves with the invading Swedes, leading in the aftermath to all Protestants being seen as traitors. Finally, the Protestant sects were numerous and disorganized, lacking internal unity, whereas the Catholic response was much better organized.

== Significance ==
Catholicism was able to become a part of Polish identity and Polish nationalism. It marked Poland as Antemurale Christianitatis, a country defending the borders of Catholic faith, thus clearly separating Poland from its mostly Protestant, Orthodox and Muslim neighbors, It became one of the defining characteristics of the szlachta's (Polish nobility's) Golden Freedoms, and conversion to Catholicism was one of the elements of polonization of the Ruthenian nobility.

Critics of the Counter-Reformation argue that it had contributed to the Commonwealth's decline, by reducing its cultural pluralism, tolerance, and receptiveness to foreign ideas, and by bringing about a stagnation in the intellectual life.

== See also ==
- Tumult of Thorn (Toruń)
- Franco de Franco, nearly executed for Protestantism
