= Franco de Franco =

Victim of religious intolerance (1585–1611)

Franco de Franco (c. 1585 – 30 June 1611) was an Italian Calvinist who was sentenced to death in the Polish–Lithuanian Commonwealth on religious grounds. He is one of the victims of the religious intolerance in this country, besides e.g. Katarzyna Weiglowa and Iwan Tyszkiewicz.

== Early life and conversion to Calvinism ==
Franco originated from western Friuli which belonged to the Venetian Republic; he spent his childhood and youth there. He came to Poland with his father who became administrator of the Wieliczka domain. Later he worked as civil servant at the Wieliczka Salt Mine under supervision of his paternal uncle Pietro de Franco. Because his paternal uncle was a devout Catholic, probably only after his death in 1603 Franco approached Protestants in Kraków.

He adopted Calvinism and became its ardent supporter. In order to promote this faith amongst his countrymen, he returned to Italy. However, he was soon arrested by the Inquisition in Brescia. After 9 months he managed to escape from the prison. He reached the German Lutheran countries, and on 10 September 1605 enrolled (as Francus Franchi Italus) in the Wittenberg University. He earned his living by teaching the Italian language and dances. Frankfurt on the Oder was also a place of his studies. In May 1608, he moved to Dresden, where was arrested for unknown reasons. Then he left for Leipzig, where he made acquaintance with Samuel Piątkowicz, a Calvinist student from Vilnius. This relationship caused Franco's return to Poland, and he settled in Vilnius. He commenced the missionary action amongst the local Italian colony there.

== Vilnius events and trial ==
On 2 June 1611 (then Catholics celebrated the Corpus Christi), Franco attended the religious service in the Vilnius Calvinist church, during which minister Andrzej Chrząstowski sharply criticised Catholic religious ceremonies as idolatry. Then Franco spoke to the Corpus Christi procession: You poor blind, you are making the enormous idolatry, when you worship the wafer and you are praising it […] Give the glory back to God who is in heaven, and stop the idolatry, neither don't bestow the divine glory on terrestrial things! Franco was attacked and beaten by the crowd. The royal preacher Piotr Skarga and the papal nuncio Simonetta participated in the procession, and witnessed Franco's action.

Franco was imprisoned. Samuel Piątkowicz became Franco's solicitor. During his trial Franco urged the bishop "to stop deceiving people, and ordering to bow before idols, but to deliver the pure word of God ". In order to avoid such a propaganda, the bishop ordered to empty the courtroom of outsiders. Catholic officials accused Franco of a conspiracy to kill the Queen, the royal prince or the bishop. Even after torture Franco did not confess to such a conspiracy. Many Polish–Lithuanian Protestant noblemen stood up in Franco's defence, but Calvinist magnates Radziwiłł did not support him because of his low descent. Franco's case was referred to the Pope, and Piotr Skarga personally interfered to obtain a death sentence.

== Execution and aftermath ==
Franco could have saved his life by converting to Catholicism, but he refused. According to Janusz Tazbir, Franco through his action wanted to change the passivity of Polish Protestants in face of triumphs and progresses of the Counter-Reformation. The execution took place in the vault of Vilnius Town Hall as the officials were afraid it could provoke outbreaks of violence and arson. First the executioner tore Franco's tongue out (it was a customary penalty for the blasphemy). Next his body was chopped to pieces which were hung on the pillory. Then his body was burnt, and ashes were thrown into the river.

Soon after this execution, on 2 and 3 July, a religious riot broke out in Vilnius, during which the Calvinist church was plundered and burnt, and one minister was killed. Franco's case fired up religious disputes and worsened the situation of Protestants in the Grand Duchy of Lithuania. Numerous pleas of Protestant gentry to the King and the Sejm brought no result – the gentry did not manage to pass a bill against riots. Afterwards, Franco was forgotten in Poland, but West-European Protestants (e.g. David Pareus), and Polish Brethren (e.g. Andrzej Lubieniecki), who stigmatized the Counter-Reformation, wrote about him.
