= Eight sermons before the Sejm =

1597 book by Piotr Skarga

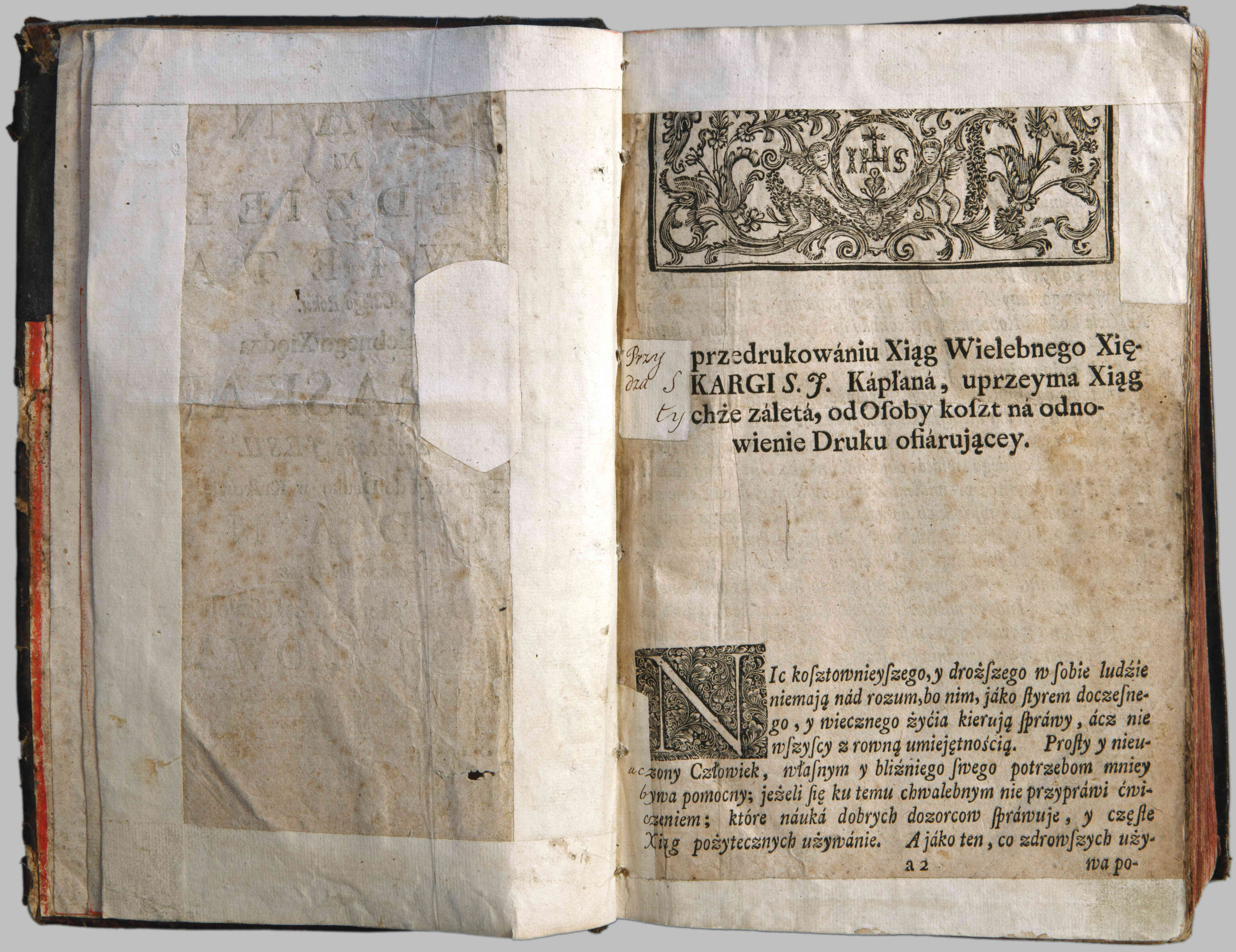
Kazania na niedziele y swięta całego roku (Sermons for Sundays and Holidays for the Entire Year) by Skarga

Sejm Sermons or the Eight sermons before the Sejm, (Polish: Kazania sejmowe) is a political treatise by Polish Jesuit Piotr Skarga, published in 1597. It is one of two most famous works by Skarga, the other being Żywoty świętych (The Lives of the Saints).

== Origin ==
Skarga likely composed the work in the aftermath of an unruly parliament session (Sejm) of February–March 1597. After a number of quarrels, the Sejm failed to pass any legislation, even those related to national security; some suspected that foreign powers bribed some deputies to ensure this outcome. Skarga published the Sermons later that year as a supplement to the second edition of his Kazania na niedziele i święta całego roku (Sermons for Sundays and Holidays for the Entire Year).

== Content ==
In the Sermons, Skarga discusses what he sees as the problems of the ailing Commonwealth: lack of love for the Fatherland, internal quarrels, tolerance of "heretics", the relative powerlessness of the king, problematic laws (a critique of the Golden Freedoms) and immorality. Another noteworthy aspect of the book is its focus on the desperate situation of the serfs (the peasants).

== History and significance ==
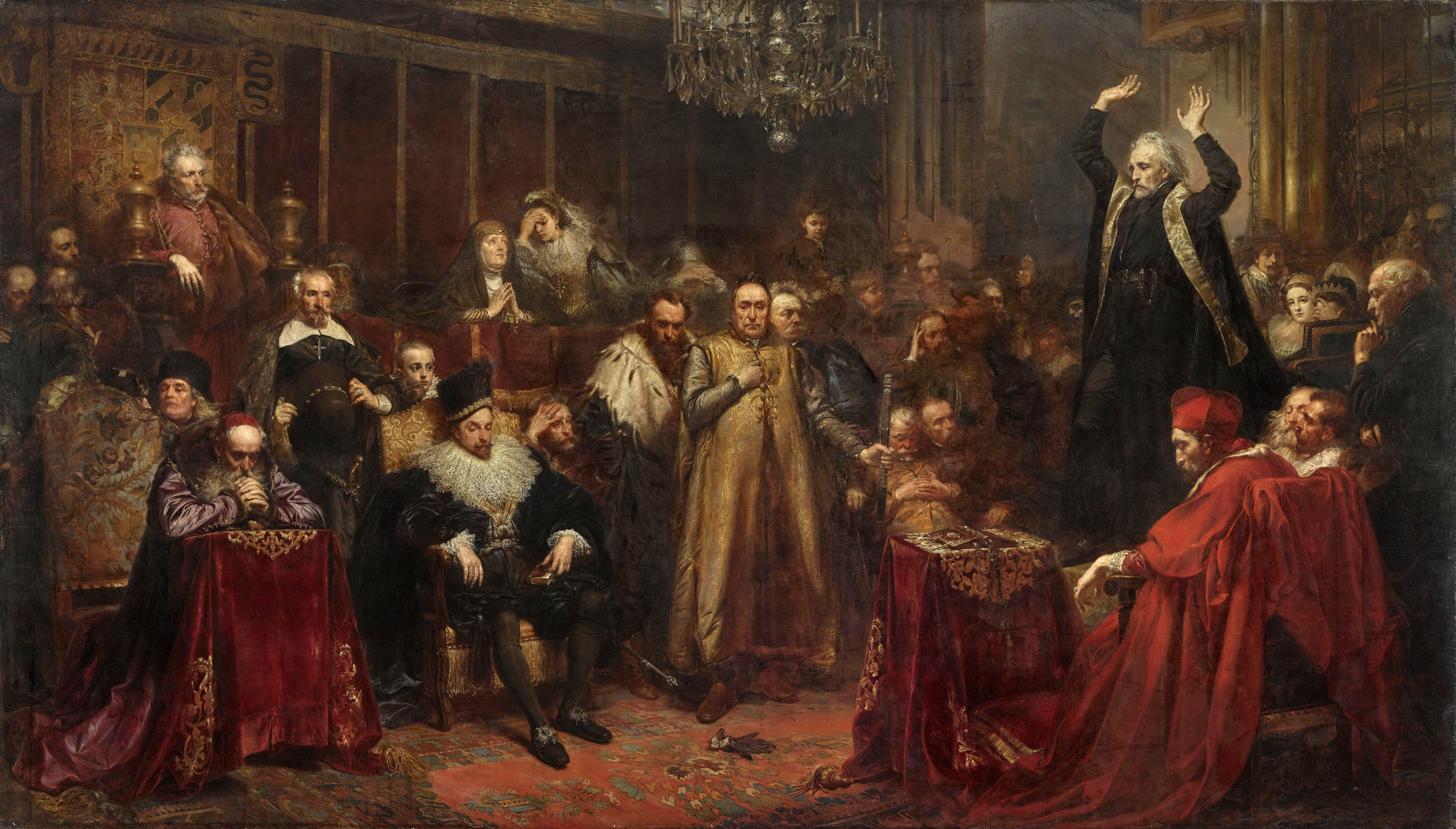
Skarga's Sermon, by Jan Matejko, 1862, oil on canvas, 224 × 397 cm., Royal Castle, Warsaw. Piotr Skarga (standing at right) preaches. King Sigismund III Vasa is seated in the first row, left of center.

Polish historian Janusz Tazbir, author of Skarga's biography, notes that there is an incorrect myth that the Sermons were delivered as a real sermon to the king and deputies. Although a sermon would traditionally open and close the Sejm session, there is no proof that Skarga's work was ever delivered to the deputies (or anyone else for that matter) in the form of a real sermon (although it is likely that the book incorporates fragments of real sermons, perhaps even some that Skarga or another priest delivered to the deputies of the 1597 Sejm – however no tangible proof for that has been found by the historians).

The book went in fact mostly unnoticed by its contemporaries, to the degree that Tazbir finds puzzling. They would not be reprinted individually until 1792. The book was rediscovered and gained fame in the period of the Partitions of Poland, when the ailings of the Polish state, including many criticized by Skarga, resulted in the loss of Polish independence and sovereignty for over a century. Skarga's prediction of the country's fall, combined with the quality of his prose, led to his recognition as a "patriotic seer". Inconvenient historical context – such as that Skarga blamed religious tolerance as one of the chief evils, and incorrectly saw the Muslim Ottoman Empire as the Polish–Lithuanian Commonwealth's primary threat – was swept aside by the positive reviews and endorsements of numerous 19th-century historians, as well as artists, most notably poet Adam Mickiewicz and painter Jan Matejko, the latter immortalizing Skarga on his painting Kazanie Skargi (Skarga's Sermon).

Sermons had several editions and were subject of several works by historians such as Stanisław Kot and Mirosław Korolko.

In 1916 Adam Berga translated Sermons in French under the title Les Sermons politiques (sermons de diete, 1597) du P.Skarga S.J and prefaced it with a critical introduction. The same year Berga published a monograph about Skarga, Un prédicateur de la cour de Pologne sous Sigismond III, Pierre Skarga, 1536-1612: étude sur la Pologne du XVIe siècle et le protestantisme polonaise.
