= Piotr Skarga =

Polish Jesuit and writer (1536–1612)

Servant of God Piotr Skarga
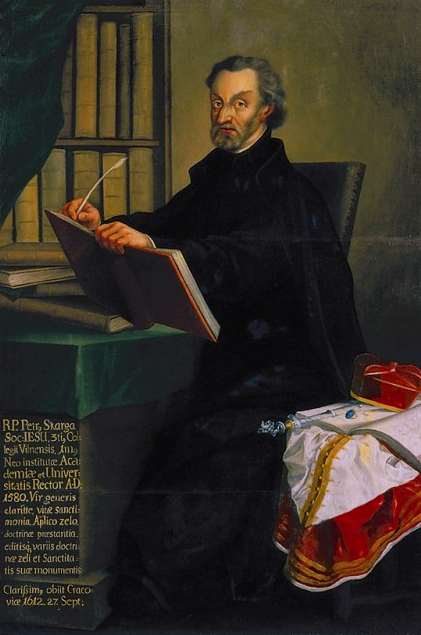
- Anonymous 17th-century portrait
- Born: 2 February 1536; Grójec, Kingdom of Poland
- Died: 27 September 1612 (aged 76); Kraków, Polish–Lithuanian Commonwealth
- Resting place: Saints Peter and Paul Church, Kraków
- Other names: Piotr Powęski, Piotr Pawęski
- Education: Jagiellonian University
- Notable work: Sejm Sermons, Lives of the Saints
- Title: Chancellor of Vilnius University
- Parents: Michał (Michael) Skarga (father); Anna Skarga née Świętek (mother)

Piotr Skarga (less often Piotr Powęski, incorrectly: Pawęski; (Note: His surname Skarga (in Polish, the word means "accusation" or "complaint") has been misinterpreted by some as having been inspired by his career as a social critic. Tazbir points out that the surname Skarga had been borne by at least one generation of his ancestors: his grandfather had used the surname Powęski, while his parents had used the surname Skarga.) 2 February 1536 – 27 September 1612) was a Polish Jesuit, preacher, hagiographer, polemicist, and leading figure of the Counter-Reformation in the Polish–Lithuanian Commonwealth. Due to his oratorical gifts, he has been called "the Polish Bossuet".

Skarga is remembered by Poles as a vigorous early advocate of reforms to the Polish–Lithuanian polity, and as a critic of the Commonwealth's governing classes, as well as of its religious tolerance policies. He advocated strengthening the monarch's power at the expense of parliament (the Sejm) and of the nobility (the szlachta).

He was a professor at the Kraków Academy and in 1579 he became the first rector of the Vilnius Academy. Later, he served in the Jesuit College at Kraków. He was also a prolific writer, and his The Lives of the Saints (Żywoty świętych, 1579) was for several centuries one of the most popular books in the Polish language. His other important work was the Sejm Sermons (Kazania Sejmowe, 1597), a political treatise, which became popular in the second half of the 19th century, when he was seen as the "patriotic seer" who predicted the partitions of Poland.

== Life ==
Skarga was born on 2 February 1536, north of Grójec, in the small folwark (manor) of Powęszczyzna (also known as Skargowszczyzna or Skargowo). His family are often described as lesser landless szlachta (gentry, or nobility), but it seems likely most of his ancestors had been peasants, later townsfolk who had only recently become minor nobility. He was reared at the family estate, and lost his parents when he was young; his mother died when he was eight years old, and his father, Michał Skarga, four years later. Thereafter he was supported by his brothers, one of whom, Stanisław Skarga, was a priest. Piotr started his education at a parochial school in Grójec before moving to Kraków, where in 1552 he enrolled at the Kraków Academy, precursor to Jagiellonian University. His teachers included the priests Marcin Glicjusz and Jan Leopolida. He finished his studies in 1555.

Immediately after he finished his education, he served for two years as rector of the collegiate school at St. John's Church in Warsaw. From October 1557 he tutored Jan Tęczyński, son of magnate Andrzej Tęczyński, and visited Vienna with his pupil, where he likely became closely acquainted with the Society of Jesus, a key order of the Counter-Reformation. He then returned to Poland, which emerged as one of the main terrains of struggle between the Protestant Reformation movement and the Catholic Church's Counter-Reformation. From 1562 he served as a parson in Rohatyn, and around 1564 he took holy orders. That year he became a canon, and the following year he also served as chancellor of the Lwów chapter. From 1566 to 1567 he was chaplain at the court of castellan Jan Krzysztof Tarnowski (the royal secretary to King Sigismund II Augustus); after Tarnowski's death he returned to Lwów, taking up the position of the cathedral preacher.

In 1568 he departed for Rome, arriving in 1569 and joining the Society of Jesus. In 1571 he returned to Poland, and preached successively at Pułtusk, Lwów, Jarosław, Warsaw (where he delivered a sermon before the Sejm) and Płock, where he visited the court of Queen Anna Jagiellon, who would become one of his patrons. A leading proponent of Counter-Reformation, Skarga commonly preached against non-Catholic denominations and helped secure funds and privileges for the Society of Jesus.

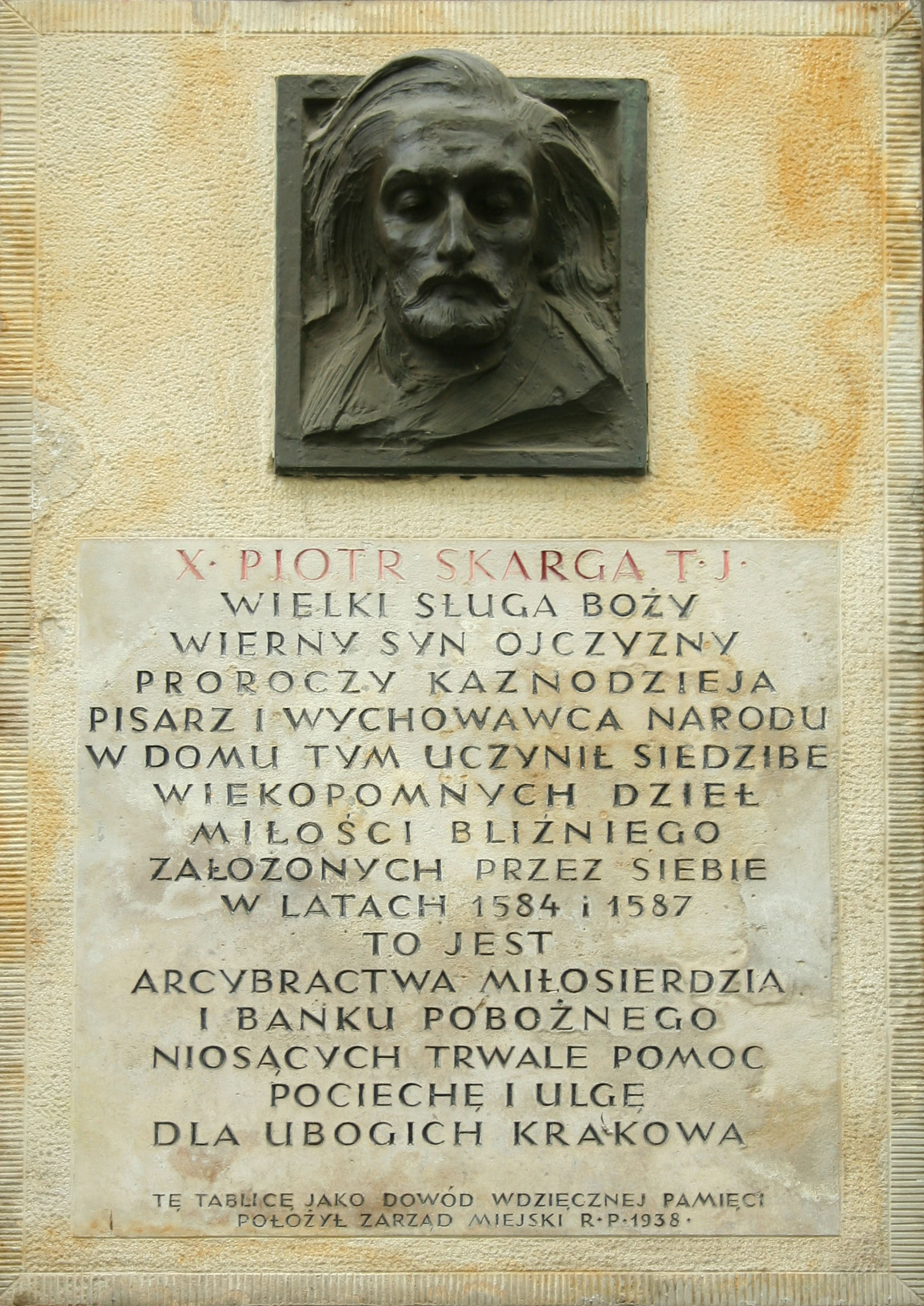
Kraków plaque commemorating Skarga

In 1573 he was rector of the Vilnius Jesuit College, precursor to the Vilnius Academy (now Vilnius University). In 1577 he became a professor at the Kraków Academy. That year he also finished one of his most important works, The Lives of the Saints (Żywoty świętych), which was published two years later. In 1579 he became the first rector of the Vilnius Academy.

In 1576 he published Pro Sacratissima Eucharistia contra haeresim Zwinglianam, ad Andream Volanum (For the Most Sacred Eucharist, against the Zwinglian Heresy, to Andrzej Wolan). In 1582 he published Artes duodecim Sacramentariorum, sive Zwinglio-calvinistarum (The Seven Pillars on Which Stands Catholic Doctrine on the Most Sacred Sacrament of the Altar). Both these works formed part of Skarga's dialogue with the Calvinist author Andrzej Wolan, which took the form of a series of rival polemics over a number of years. Wolan was a notable figure in the Commonwealth politics—not only a publicist, but a royal secretary, diplomat and Sejm deputy.

In 1584 Skarga was transferred to the new Jesuit College at Kraków. On 26 March 1587 he founded the Polish version of the Mount of Piety, a pawnbroker run as a charity and called in Polish the Bank Pobożny (lit. the Pious Bank). In 1588 the newly elected King Sigismund III Vasa established the new post of court preacher, and Skarga became the first priest to hold it. Skarga became a valued adviser to the King, and Sigismund became so fond of him that when the priest considered retirement, Sigismund rejected this, requesting that he remain at court for as long as possible.

As part of his Counter-Reformation policies, Skarga was also a major proponent of the Union of Brest, a merger between the Roman Catholic Church and a faction of the Eastern Orthodox Church. His influence on King Sigismund, whom he supported (or encouraged) in opposing religious tolerance and seeking to strengthen royal power, was a factor that has been cited as a cause of the civil war—the (ultimately unsuccessful) Zebrzydowski Rebellion of 1606—in which the royal faction confronted a popular movement among the nobility, led by the Zebrzydowski family, who sought to depose Sigismund. Some critics referred to Skarga as "the principal mischief-maker of the Kingdom" (in the Latin, "pracecipuus turbator Regnii").

In 1611 he delivered his final sermon before the Sejm and published his final work, an ideological testament, Wzywanie do jednej zbawiennej wiary (A Call for One Redeeming Faith). He remained Sigismund's court preacher until April 1612, four months before his death.

Skarga died on 27 September 1612 and was buried in the Saints Peter and Paul Church in Kraków.

== Writer ==
In addition to being a well-known preacher, Skarga was the author of numerous theological texts and polemics.

His two most important works are The Lives of the Saints (Żywoty świętych, 1579) and Sejm Sermons (Kazania Sejmowe, 1597). The former, a hagiography, won him fame in his lifetime, while the Sermons gained recognition only in subsequent centuries, during the Partitions of Poland. Tazbir describes the Lives as Skarga's chief work and as a major attack on the religious tolerance promoted by the Warsaw Confederation. The book was immensely popular, the first edition selling out by 1583. A second edition was published in 1585, and by the mid-17th century twelve editions had been printed, making it one of the most popular books published in Poland and Lithuania in that era (rivaled by the Kronika Polska—Polish Chronicles—of Marcin Bielski). It was Skarga's most popular work and continued to rank highly with Polish readers until the 18th and 19th centuries, when it was eclipsed by his Sermons.

The Sermons, a political treatise composed in the guise of sermons, went almost unnoticed by contemporaries. In the Sermons, Skarga discusses what he sees as the problems of the ailing Commonwealth: lack of patriotism, internal quarrels, tolerance of heretics, the king's relative powerlessness, perverse laws (a critique of the nobility's Golden Freedoms (Note: In the 16th century, when most European monarchies wielded considerable autocratic power, those of Poland and of the Polish–Lithuanian Commonwealth were relatively weak, with much of the political power in the hands of the szlachta (nobility). Under a system known as the Golden Freedoms, the szlachta elected the king, could veto his acts in the Sejm (parliament), and had the right to stage a rebellion (rokosz) against him in defense of their rights and privileges.)), and immorality. Another notable aspect of the book is its focus on the desperate plight of the serfs (the peasants).

== Importance ==
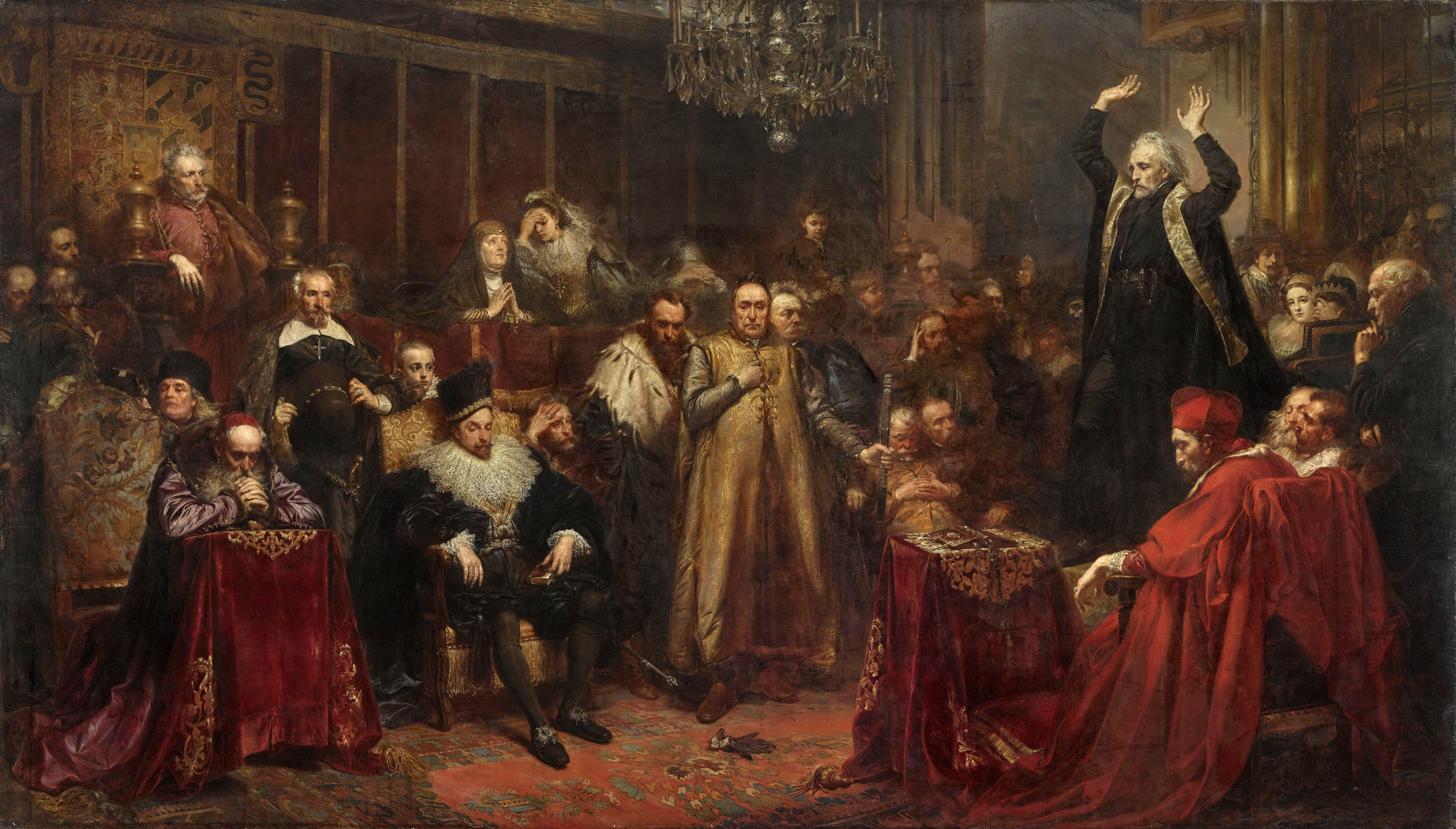
Skarga's Sermon, by Matejko, 1862. Skarga (standing, right) preaches, while King Sigismund III Vasa sits in the first row, left of center.

Janusz Tazbir, in his 1978 biography of Skarga, noted that "there already is an extensive literature on Skarga". He attributed this to Skarga's being the most famous figure of the Polish Counter-Reformation, which gained him his initial fame; and, later, to his rediscovered reform proposals which, while controversial in his time, gained him renown during the Partitions of Poland and have been well regarded since.

His popularity as the "patriotic seer" who predicted the Partitions reached a zenith in the second half of the 19th century, when some historians, such as Ignacy Chrzanowski, went so far as to speak of "the cult of Skarga." Tazbir states that Skarga's writings are valued primarily for their advocacy of political and socioeconomic reforms, rather than for their theological content.

From the Polish Enlightenment of the middle of the 18th century onward, his works, penned in Polish rather than in Latin, have also been increasingly valued for their style and contributions to the development of the written Polish language and of Polish literature. Skarga has been positively viewed not only by historians but by poet Adam Mickiewicz and painter Jan Matejko; the former called Skarga's Lives a "most poetic Polish masterpiece", and the latter created a well-known painting, Kazanie Skargi (Skarga's Sermon).

Over the centuries, Skarga became a character in a number of other artistic works, including a novel by Józef Ignacy Kraszewski, though he has never been the chief character in any literary work longer than a poem.

In 1936, on the 400th anniversary of Skarga's birth, with the endorsement of Poland's President Ignacy Mościcki and the Polish government, the Polish writer Zofia Kossak-Szczucka proposed that Skarga be beatified. Nearly eight decades later, Skarga's cause for beatification was inaugurated on 12 June 2013.

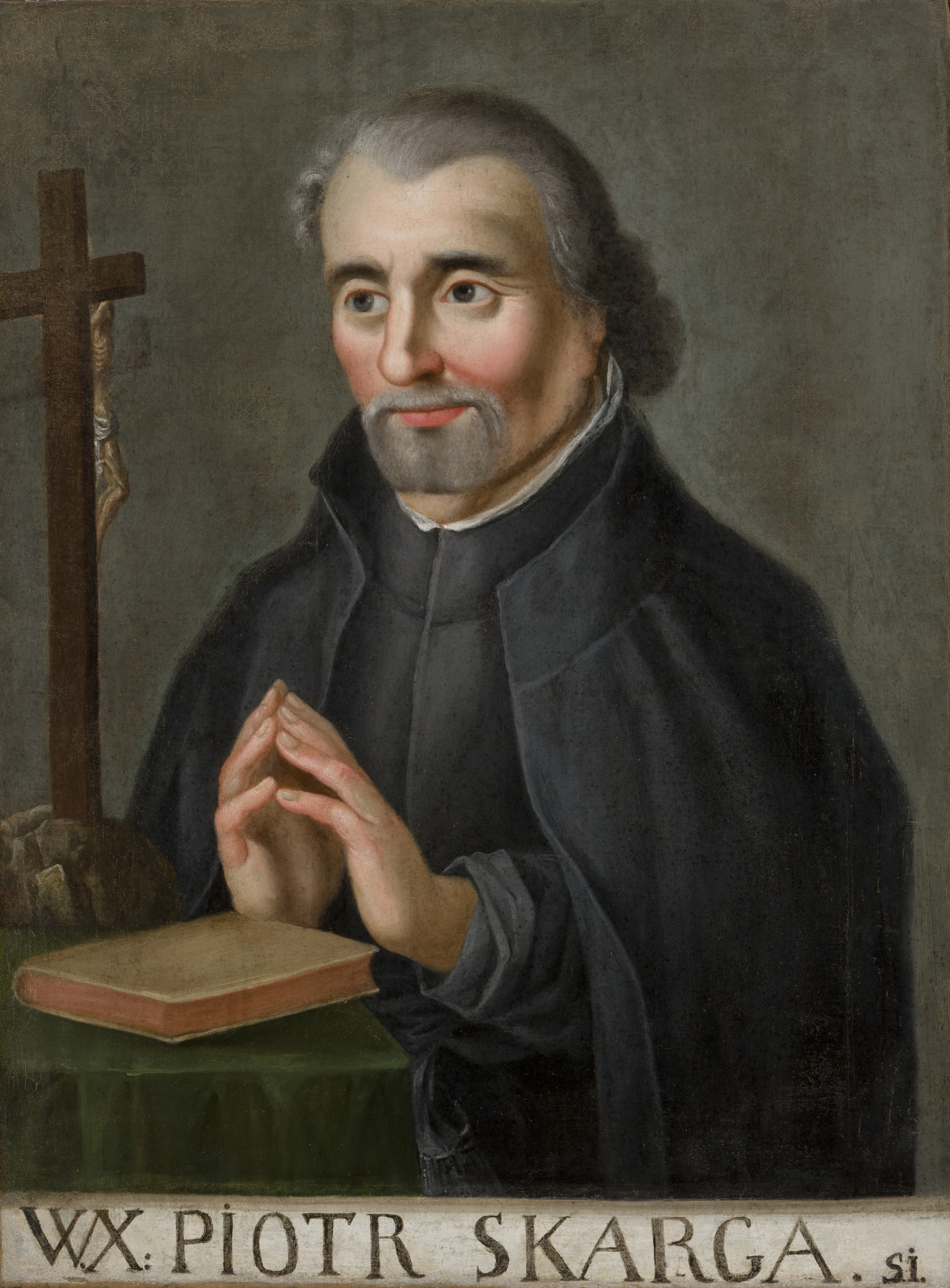
19th-century portrait of Piotr Skarga, National Museum in Kraków

In 2012, on the 400th anniversary of his death, the Polish Sejm declared that year the "Year of the Reverend Piotr Skarga". The decision caused considerable controversy: a Calvinist polemicist Kazimierz Bem called it in the newspaper Rzeczpospolita "an example of deep disdain Poland holds for any of its minorities." The newspaper carried a rejoinder. The Lutheran Church in Poland called the decision to commemorate Skarga "disturbing" and not understandable in the realm of separation of church and state"

He is patron of Stowarzyszenie Kultury Chrześcijańskiej im. ks. Piotra Skargi.

== Writings ==
- Pro Sacratissima Eucharistia contra haeresim Zwinglianam, ad Andream Volanum (For the Most Sacred Eucharist, against the Zwinglian Heresy, 1576)
- Lives of the Saints (Żywoty świętych, 1579, eight editions in his lifetime).
- Artes duodecim Sacramentariorum, sive Zwinglio-calvinistarum (Siedem filarów, na których stoi katolicka nauka o Przenajświętszym Sakramencie Ołtarza, llThe Seven Pillars on Which Stands Catholic Doctrine on the Most Sacred Sacrament of the Altarll, 1582)
- Sejm Sermons (Kazania sejmowe, 1597, published posthumously).
- Soldiers' Devotions (Żołnierskie nabożeństwo, 1606).
- Wzywanie do jednej zbawiennej wiary (A Call for One Redeeming Faith, 1611)

== See also ==
- Antonio Possevino
- Stanisław of Skarbimierz
- Szymon Starowolski

== Bibliography ==
- Tazbir, Janusz (1978). Piotr Skarga, Szermierz kontrreformacji [Piotr Skarga: Champion of the [Polish] Counter-Reformation]. Warsaw: Państwowe Wydawnictwo "Wiedza Powszechna".
