= Ben (Hebrew) =

The Hebrew word Ben (בן), meaning "son" or "boy" and also "son of", forms part of many surnames in Hebrew also found in Arabic as bin/ben or ibn/ebn (بن or ابن).

In the English Bible, such names include:

- Ben-ammi, "son of my people"
- Benaiah, "son of Yah(God)"
- Bene-berak, "sons of lightning"
- Ben-hadad, "son of Hadad"
- Ben-hail, "son of valor"
- Ben-Ishado, "son of Ishado"
- Benjamin, "son of the right hand" or "son of the south"
- Ben-oni, "son of my sorrow"
- Ben-Zion, "son of Zion"

== See also ==
- Bar (Aramaic)
