= Sermon of Piotr Skarga =

Painting by Jan Matejko

The Sermon of Piotr Skarga
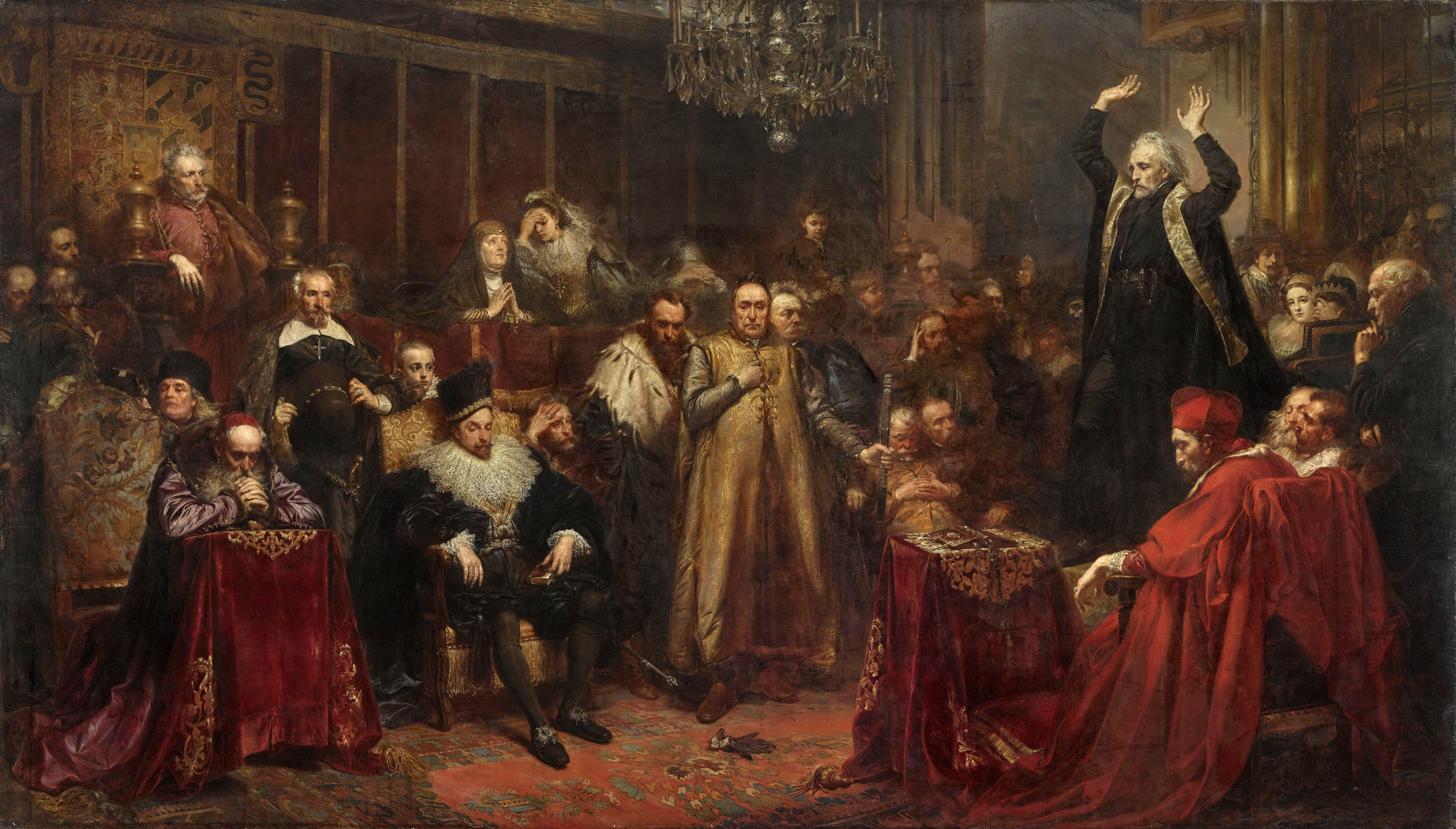
- Artist: Jan Matejko
- Year: 1864
- Medium: Oil on canvas
- Dimensions: 224 cm × 397 cm (88 in × 156 in)
- Location: National Museum, Warsaw

The Sermon of Piotr Skarga or Skarga's Sermon (Polish: Kazanie Skargi) is a large oil painting by Jan Matejko, finished in 1864, now in the National Museum, Warsaw in Poland. It depicts a sermon on political matters by the Jesuit priest Piotr Skarga, a chief figure of the Counter Reformation in Poland, where he rebukes the Polish elite for neglecting the national interest.

Skarga's Sermon is among Matejko's most famous works, and like other historical paintings by Matejko includes several portraits of identifiable historical figures of the period, as well as in this case a self-portrait of the artist in the figure of Skarga.

== History ==
Matejko finished the painting in May 1864. It was the first "large" painting of Matejko (the canvas had the size of over 8 square metres (86 sq ft), several times larger than any of his prior work). It was displayed in the gallery of the Kraków Society of Friends of Fine Art (Towarzystwo Przyjaciół Sztuk Pięknych w Krakowie). Painting's premiere drew crowds and reviews comparable with modern movie premieres. Soon afterwards Count Maurycy Potocki bought it for 10,000 florins.

== Composition and significance ==
The painting shows Poland of the early 17th century, a country torn between the magnates and elected kings of the House of Vasa, with a proud and egoistical nobility, beginning a slide into an ungovernable anarchy. In that context, little heed was paid to the calls of many individuals (such as Skarga) for reform. Matejko's work became one of the major elements of the "legend of Piotr Skarga", helping the Jesuit achieve a lasting fame in Poland. Although Matejko's work fits within the genre of historical painting, with the Sermon... he departed from strict adherence to historical accuracy, focusing more on the message; thus this painting, like many of his subsequent works, included characters or items that could not have been present at the depicted scene.

The painting portrays Piotr Skarga, a Jesuit, giving a sermon in the presbytery of the Wawel Cathedral. He is visible at the top right, clad in black, with his hands raised, paused in the middle of the speech. His face is that of Matejko himself, if significantly aged (another source, however, suggests that Matejko asked Michał Szweycer to pose for Skarga instead). Skarga is the only animated character in the composition, all other individuals are shown as immobile, standing or sitting. The title of the painting suggests that the theme of Skarga's speech is his famous critique of the Polish government and a prophecy of its destruction. In reality, however, there is no proof that Skarga's work was ever delivered in the form of a real sermon.

Various historical figures, listening to the sermon, react to it through posture and facial expressions in a manner that suggest Matejko's view of their historical role. In the center, magnates Janusz Radziwiłł (1579-1620) (in a golden robe), Stanisław Stadnicki, Mikołaj Zebrzydowski, stand together, arrogant and unfazed. Jerzy Mniszech, Jan Piotr Sapieha and Janusz Zbaraski (Note: Rezler identifies the third magnate as Janusz Zborowski; there was however no member of Zborowski family with that name. Gorzkowski also uses the same name, but also gives him a title - voivode of the Braclaw Voivodeship. Janusz Zbaraski held that position in the years 1576-1608, corresponding with he time frame depicted by the painting.) to their right seem to be listening, but an older nobleman is dozing nearby as a reminder that most nobility did not care either way about the issues Skarga is discussing. To their left, the king, Sigismund III Vasa, seems not to be paying too much attention to the preacher. His foreign garb stresses his unwillingness to integrate with his subjects; he always considered himself more of a Swede than a Pole, and would have preferred to be a king of Sweden instead. Sigismund is portrayed by Matejko as the second most important character in the painting, as he is also illuminated by light, albeit immobile, compared to Skarga. Sigismund's son, prince and future king Władysław IV Waza, stands above and to the left of the king. To his right, two women - Queen Anna Jagiellonka and Halszka Ostrogska are present. A glove on the floor between the king and the magnates is a sign of the upcoming civil war.

At the top left, chancellor Jan Zamoyski listens, tired. This ambitious and successful politician and military commander seems to understand the gravity of Skarga's words, but he is near the end of his life. Mikołaj Wolski is visible between the prince and the chancellor. Underneath Zamoyski, archbishop Stanisław Karnkowski in purple is praying, and between these two the metropolitan of the Unites, Hipacy Pociej, is visibly not taken by the Jesuit's oratory.

The Papal nuncio Germanicus Malaspina, bishop of San Severo, is visible at Skarga's bottom right. Cardinal Enrico Caetani (in red) is shown below Skarga, and Spanish and Austrian envoys, bored and distanced, are behind him.

=== Praise ===
On 5 November 1864, in recognition for his contributions to recreating historical themes as exemplified in this painting, Matejko was elected a member of the Kraków Scientific Society (Towarzystwo Naukowe Krakowskie). This painting was the one that made Matejko famous not only in (partitioned) Poland, but beyond, in Europe. In 1865 the painting was awarded a gold medal at the annual Paris salon. Parisian critics reviewed the work of 26-year-old Matejko very positively, comparing it favorably to the work of Paul Delaroche and Louis Gallait, although many considered the theme of Polish history rather obscure, and some argued that the painting was too dark (too much blacks and violets).

The painting has been compared to Jan August Hendrik Leys's Restoration of the Catholic rite in the Holiest Virgin Mary Church in Antwerp in 1566, as regards its composition and Counter Reformation theme.
