= Daejan Holdings =

British property business

Daejan Holdings plc
- Industry: Property
- Founded: 1935
- Headquarters: London, England
- Key people: Benzion Freshwater, Chairman and CEO
- Revenue: £156.2 million (2019)
- Operating income: £158.8 million (2019)
- Net income: £120.0 million (2019)
- Website: www.daejanholdings.com

Daejan Holdings is a British-based property business, part of the Freshwater Group of companies. It has its headquarters at Freshwater House, Shaftesbury Avenue. It was listed on the London Stock Exchange as DJAN until it was acquired by the Freshwater Group in May 2020.

== History ==
The Company was formed in 1935 as Daejan Samoedra Estates Ltd to acquire rubber and coffee plantations in the Dutch East Indies, today's Indonesia, mostly on the island of Java. In 1949 an insurrection which led to the independence of Indonesia resulted in a number of plantations being occupied or destroyed. In 1959 Osias Freshwater reversed his property business (a number of landmark buildings in London) into the company and this is now its sole activity. The name of the Company changed to Daejan Holdings Limited. In 2012 Daejan bought 139-143 Oxford Street for £12.8 million.

In December 2018, it was reported that Park West, a building managed by another Freshwater Group subsidiary, had a very high proportion of flats under investigation for being let out illegally.

In February 2020, the company agreed to be acquired by Freshwater Group, its majority shareholder, for £1.3 billion.

== Operations ==
Daejan is organised into two geographic segments - UK and US - of investment properties: residential and commercial. As at 31 March 2019, its portfolio was valued at £2.5 billion.
