= Lives of the Saints (Skarga) =

1577 hagiography by Piotr Skarga

Title page, 1615 edition

The Lives of the Saints from the Old and New Testaments (Polish: Żywoty świętych starego i nowego zakonu) is a hagiography by Polish Jesuit Piotr Skarga (written in 1577, first published in 1579). It became one of the most popular Polish books ever and a classic of Polish literature. It is one of two most famous works by Skarga, the other being Sejm Sermons.

== Origin ==
The book was published in two volumes with over a thousand pages total. Skarga, inspired by some other historiographical works (ex. it is estimated he based at least four-fifths of his work on the translation of Laurentius Surius De probatis Sanctorum historiis), wrote this book in 1577, in order to combat the popularity of Protestant writings and advance the cause of the Counter-Reformation. In particular, Skarga recommended that this book should be read instead of the Holy Bible, reading of which at that time the Catholic Church did not encourage (unlike the Protestants).

== Enduring popularity and significance ==
This book, being a work of hagiography, focuses on the lives of Catholic Saints. In addition to its moral values, attractive to the Catholic church for its inspirational value "in edifying the faithful and refuting heretics", it was also attractive to the readers due to its depiction of exotic times and locales, royal and intentional politics, as well as graphic and detailed description of tortures and suffering.

The book proved to be enormously successful. The first edition was exhausted by 1583, and soon a second one was published; nine were published up to Skarga's death (1612), and altogether twelve editions were published until 1644. The interest in the book waned afterward, with no new editions until the 18th century due to market saturation, changing tastes and more competition. The book, nonetheless, remained highly popular. In addition to being a required reading in Polish Jesuit colleges and some lesser schools, it became praised by writers and scholars of the Polish language of the Enlightenment in Poland era, who commended it for its contribution to the development of the Polish language. Polish foremost poet, Adam Mickiewicz, praised it as "the most poetic Polish work ever". With the growing literacy the book popularity spread among poorer and less educated people; it was one of the first books read by many people, "an entryway into reading", and was likely one of the most popular, if not the most popular, Polish language books ever (read by the highest percentage of the Polish-reading populace up to the 20th century). Its popularity makes it a factor in preserving a Polish language literacy on the lands of partitioned Poland. Czesław Miłosz calls the book "a specimen of the purest sixteenth-century Polish [language]".

Norman Davies writes that the book "competed with Kochanowski's Polish Psalter published in the same year for the accolade of the best-known and best-loved Polish works of the succeeding centuries". It has also been called "a classic of Polish literature". Irving M. Zeitlin writes that this book "for centuries served as bedside reading for the Polish people."

It is one of two most famous works by Skarga, the other being Kazania sejmowe (Sejm Sermons).

== See also ==
- Polish literature
- List of Polish writers
