= Judah Hurwitz =

Judah Hurwitz (Hebrew: יהודא בן מרדכי הלוי הורוויץ, romanized: Yehuda ben Mordekhai ha-Levi Hurvitz; 1734–1797) was a Jewish physician and author living in Amsterdam, Netherlands in the 18th century. Born in Vilnius, Lithuania, he was the son of Mordechai Hurwitz.

In 1766, his then-popular work Ammudei Beit Yehuda (translated as Pillars of the House of Judah) was published by Yehuda Leib Sussmans in Amsterdam. Although Hurwitz's stated intention in the book is to defend the theology and practice of traditional Judaism, he is often considered an early member of the Haskalah. His writings evinced interest in science.
