= Benzion Freshwater =

British businessman

- Born: Benzion Shalom Eliezer Freshwater; 1948 (age 77–78)
- Occupation: Property developer
- Relatives: Ben Zion Halberstam (grandfather)

Benzion Shalom Eliezer Freshwater (born 1948) is a British billionaire property investor of Haredi Jewish descent, known for his leadership within the Freshwater Group and its main company, Daejan Holdings. He is one of the UK's largest private landlords and is active in Orthodox Jewish philanthropy.

== Early life ==
Benzion Shalom Eliezer Freshwater is the son of Osias Freshwater (1897–1976), born in the village of Staszów, Galicia, Poland, who emigrated to England in 1939. His wife and three children were murdered in the Holocaust. In 1947 he married Nechama Golda Stempel née Halberstam, widowed daughter of Rabbi Ben Zion Halberstam, the second Bobover Rebbe, and they had two sons, Benzion and Solomon. Osias built up Daejan Holdings into one of London's largest private landlords and his sons, Benzion and Rabbi Shlomo are now Executive Directors.

== Career ==
In 2007 it was reported that he held 279 directorships. He operates mainly through Daejan Holdings plc, a company that was quoted on the London Stock Exchange until May 2020 when it was fully bought by the Freshwater family, which previously had built up a 79% stake. Daejan's UK portfolio is managed by Highdorn, part of the Freshwater Group of Companies. In 2022 they were fined £30k after failing to license a property.

In 2026, a Guardian article highlighted Freshwater's and Daejan's name, depicting them as "absentee landlords" responsible for the high level of vacant shops in the town of Newton Aycliffe, fueling political discontentment and the rise of the Reform party.

In the Sunday Times Rich List Freshwater's fortune rose from £1 billion in 2009 to £1.6 billion in 2016, with his net worth estimated at £2.6 billion according to the 2025 edition.

He is a trustee of Mayfair Charities Limited, a registered charity which disbursed £8,553,000 in 2007-8 to "organisations and institutions engaged in the provision of education and promotion of religious observance within the tenets of orthodox Judaism and for the relief of poverty."
