= Bentsion Fleishman =

Russian mathematician (born 1923)

Bentsion Shimonovich Fleishman (Russian: Бенцион Шимонович Флейшман, born 21 November 1923) is a Russian scientist in the field of mathematical statistics, combinatorial analysis and their applications, doctor of physical and mathematical sciences, professor, author of constructive information theory and the theory of potential efficiency.

== Life and career ==
Fleishman was born in Moscow on 21 November 1923. In 1947, he graduated from the Moscow State University, the Department of Probability Theory, headed by A. N. Kolmogorov and was sent to work in the cryptographic service of the Ministry of State Security of the USSR. After his discharge in 1954, he worked at the institutes of the USSR Academy of Sciences: the Institute of Radio Engineering and Electronics (1955–1968) and the Institute of Oceanology (1968–1996).

Potential efficiency theory is a synthesis of reliability theory, information theory and game theory, the successor of cybernetics, aiming at biological and engineering systems on general conceptual and mathematical basis. Its main concept – efficiency – is defined as the probability to achieve the goal with limited resources. Other fundamental concepts are purposeful choice and probabilistic feasibility of engineering systems. The theory was first formulated in his book Elements of the Theory of Potential Efficiency of Complex Systems (1971).

Fleishman wrote more than a hundred scientific articles and five books. From 1966 to 1996, he was the head of the cybernetics and environmental problems section of the Scientific and Technical Society of Radio Engineering, Electronics and Communications. After moving to the US in 1996, he worked on applications of potential efficiency theory and became a member of the International Society for Risk Analysis.

== Bibliography ==
- A. E. Basharinov, B. S. Fleishman, Methods of statistical sequential analysis and their applications, Moscow: Sov. Radio, 1962;
- B. S. Fleishman, Constructive methods of optimal coding for noisy channels, Moscow: Publishing House of the Academy of Sciences of the USSR, 1963;
- B. S. Fleishman, Elements of the theory of potential efficiency of complex systems, Moscow: Sov. Radio, 1971 (2nd edition, Smolensk: Oikumene, 2008);
- B. S. Fleishman, Fundamentals of Systemology, Radio and Communications, Moscow, 1982 (2nd ed. New York: Lulu.com, 2007);
- B. Fleishman. Stochastic theory of ecological interactions. Ecological Modeling, vol. 17, 1982, p. 65-73;
- B. Fleishman. Hyperbolic law of reliability and its logarithmic effects in ecology. Ecological Modeling, vol. 55, 1991, p. 75-88;
- B. Fleishman, Stochastic Theory of Complex Ecological Systems (cap.6). In: B. Patten, S. Jorgenson (eds) Complex Ecology. Prentice Hall PTP, Prentice Hall Inc, A. Simon & Schuster, Englewood Cliffs, New Jersey, 07632, 1995, p. 166-224;
- B. Fleishman, The Choice is Yours, Moscow: Oikumena, 2000 (2nd ed., New York: Lulu.com, 2008).
