= Ben-Zion Alfes =

Rabbi, author and Jewish orator (1851–1940)

Rabbi Ben-Zion Alfes
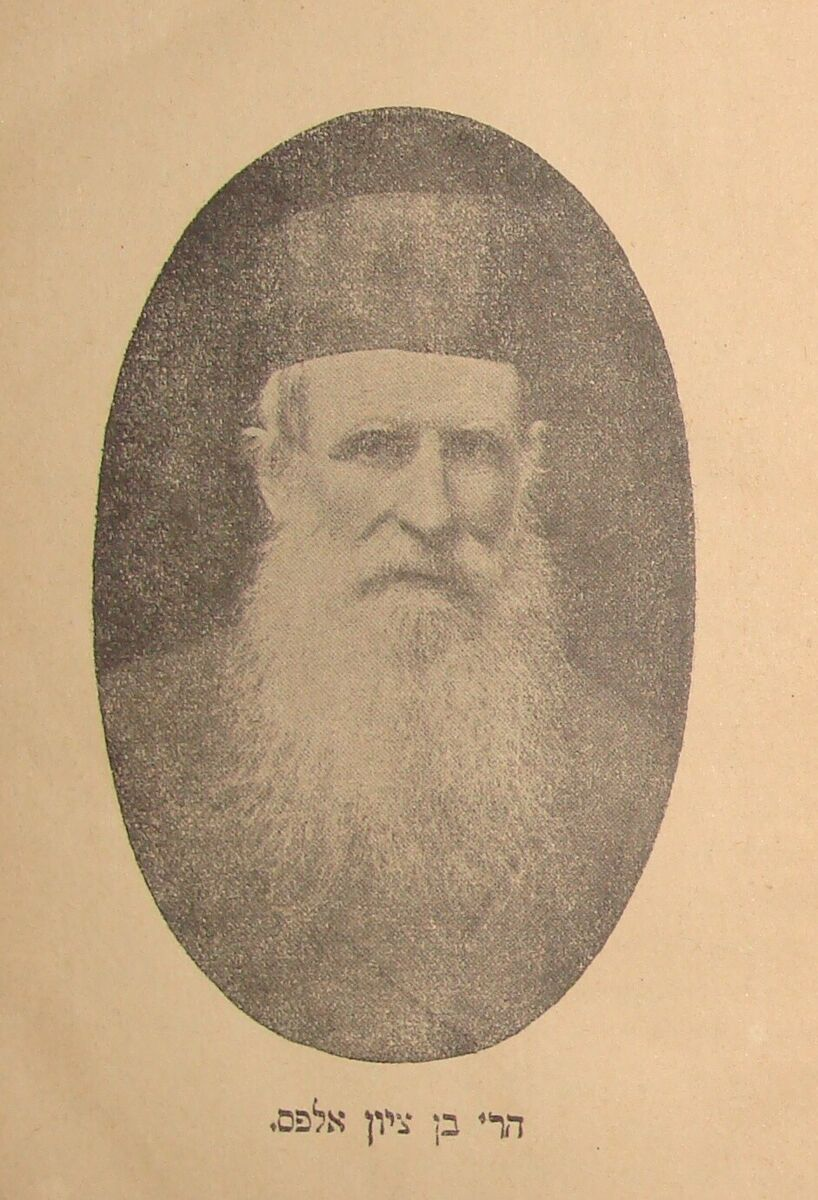
- Born: 5 November 1850; Vilna, Lithuania
- Died: 23 December 1940 (aged 90); Jerusalem, Israel
- Resting place: Mount of Olives
- Occupations: Rabbi, author, orator
- Spouse: Nechama Rosinai

Ben-Zion Alfes (Hebrew: בן-ציון אלפס) (1851–1940) was a well known Rabbi, prolific author and Jewish orator (Maggid) who traveled to many Jewish communities in tireless support of many Jewish causes. He wrote some 60 books, including the extremely popular series Maaseh Alfes, which became a household name. The last work he saw published, written at age 90, was an autobiography titled "The Life Story of the Maase Alfes." Another work, Toledot ve-Zikhronot, also an autobiography, but with a different focus, was published posthumously.

== Early life ==
Ben-Zion Alfes was born in Vilna to Rabbi Yirmeyahu Akiva on the first of Kislev 5611 (1851)." His mother passed away when he was 14. His father remarried the widow of Mordechai Rosinai who owned a bakery. However, his father passed away 10 months after his mothers passing. He had been studying with his father. He then enrolled in Eishyshok Yeshiva, where he became close to the son-in-law of Rabbi Avraham, brother of the Vilna Gaon. At the age of 16, he married his stepmother’s daughter Nechama. He continued his studies in the Kloiz of the Vilna Gaon for four years.

In 1872, he traveled to Palestine in the hopes of settling there. For six months he taught Jewish children without receiving a salary, and he also offered to check mezuzot in people’s homes. Due to the intense poverty in the Holy Land at the time, he had to move back to Vilna two years after his arrival. Upon returning to Vilna, he found work as a proof-reader at HaChevra Metz publishing house in Vilna for fifteenyears. In 1916-1919 he was a refugee in Poltava, having been evacuated there from the front line during World War I, and suffered there from the Bolshevik regime and the civil war. His wife Nechama died there at age 70.

== Leadership ==
His earliest books were geared towards Jewish youth. One work received an approbation from Rabbi Yisrael Meir Kagan (known as the Chofetz Chaim), who was regarded as the leader of world Jewry at the time. He also translated many religious Hebrew works into Yiddish. During his frequent travels throughout Eastern Europe, he served as a Maggid, delivering moving sermons to the public. His lectures mobilized many to charity and kindness and to supporting Jewish education. He refused to be paid for his lectures.

He was particularly attentive to educating poor children in religious elementary schools such as Toras Chesed a network of schools, established for orphans and children from impoverished backgrounds. He befriending simple folk with Yiddishkeit. He studied with ordinary people, lectured in schools and synagogue study halls. He was often sought after to perform Brit milah on his travels. In cases where he was asked to be arbitrator in disputes, he wouldn't hesitate to pay from his own pocket to the winning side the amount that the losing side had committed to pay, in order to prevent the continuation of the conflict. All his life he helped various charities and even gave his money for tuition for orphans, for Jewish soldiers in the army, etc. He established a lottery with a third of all income given to charity.

His many travels let him to meet with famous Jewish leaders such as Rabbis Israel Salanter, Yosef Dov Soloveitchik (Beis Halevi) and Shmuel Salant. Also with Rabbi Simcha Zissel Ziv, known as the Alter of Kelm, and Rabbi Naftali Zvi Yehuda Berlin both of whom publicly praised his vast range of communal work on behalf of world Jewry.

=== Liturgy ===
He punctuated his Yiddish-language translations/commentaries on Siddur, as well as Holiday prayer books (Machzorim) with Hebrew vowels, "giving them the external appearance of Hebrew." This was of major benefit to women whose schooling was in Yiddish language using the Hebrew alphabet. He became known as a pioneer of Orthodox Yiddish literature.

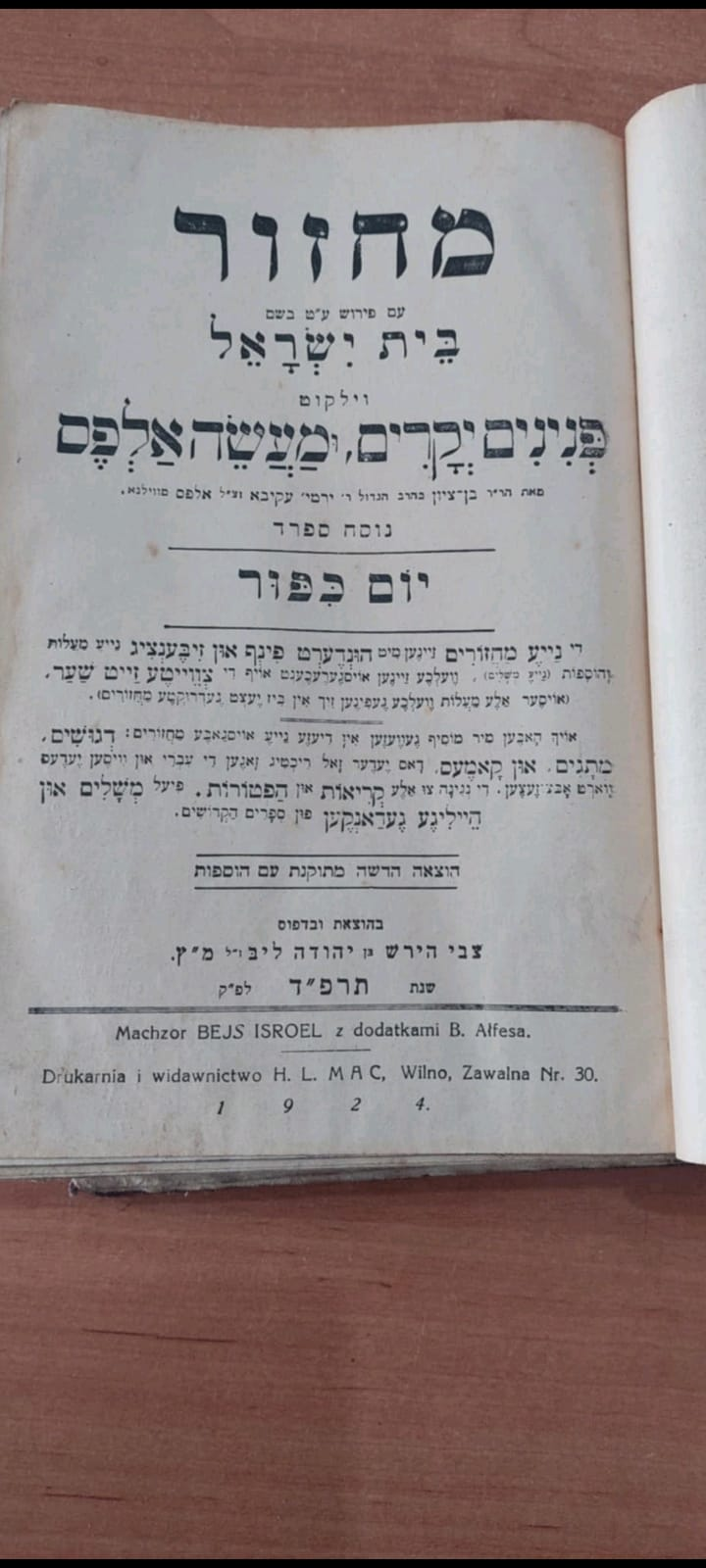
Machzor Beit Yisroel, a prayer-book for High Holidays, published by Alfes in 1924

== Later Life ==
In 1925, he returned to Palestine and settled in Petah Tikvah, where he became spiritual director of the Tiferet Bachurim society. Disregarding his old age, he continued to be active and gave lessons for the seniors and lectures in the study halls. He also helped establish two Mikvas in Petah Tikvah.

For the occasion of his ninetieth birthday, he published his memoirs, entitled "Tolda Ve-zichronot".

He passed away in Jerusalem on December 23rd 1940 (23rd of Kislev) and was buried on the Mount of Olives.

== Family ==
He and his wife Nechama (nee Rosinai) had six children:

- Esther (1869–1956), wife of Rabbi Nisson Rabin
- Shepsl Alfes (1872–1956)
- Mordechai Alfes (1877–1942) (perished in the Holocaust)
- Dr. Akiva Alfes (1879–1962)
- Sonia Gurwitch (1879–1960)
- Malka Velikowsky (1895–1965)
