= Abraham Ragoler =

Kabbalist and author, brother of the Vilna Gaon

Rabbi Abraham Ragoler

Personal life
- Born: 1722 Vilna, Lithuania
- Died: March 16, 1804 (aged 81–82) Žemaičių Naumiestis
- Spouse: Hinda Ragoler, Roise Hasid
- Children: 3, including Elijah Magid-Ragoler
- Parents: Shlomo Zalman of Vilna (father); Traina (mother)
- Notable work: Ma'alot HaTorah
- Other names: Avraham, brother of the Gra
- Relatives: Vilna Gaon (brother)

Religious life
- Religion: Judaism

Rabbi Avraham ben Solomon, (5482 / 1722–4 Nisan 5564 / 16 March 1804), also known as Abraham Ragoler (or Abraham of Ragola) was the brother of Elijah, the Vilna Gaon. He was a Kabbalist and darshan (preacher), and author of the book Ma'alot HaTorah.

== Biography ==
Avraham was born in 5482 (1722) to Rabbi Shlomo Zalman and Traina. He was the third of five boys, His elder brothers were Rabbi Elijah, the Vilna Gaon (b. 1720) and Rabbi Moshe. His younger brothers were Rabbi Yissachar Dov (author of Tzuf Devash on Torah) and Rabbi Meir.

While he was still young, he was appointed preacher of Shklow where many famous Torah scholars lived, including many students of his brother. Later, due to disputes between Hasidim and Misnagdim, Avraham moved to Ariogala (Ragola), after which he became known as Avraham Ragoler. His brother, the Vilna Gaon described him as, "A soul without a body" because of his ascetic lifestyle, separating him from anything physical.

He married Hinda Ragoler, who died c. 1758 and then Roise Hasid. He had three sons, including Elijah Magid-Ragoler.

In his final years, he moved to Neustadt- Sugint (Žemaičių Naumiestis) where his son, Rabbi Elijah, served as head of the beth din. He died on 4 Nisan 5564 (16 March 1804).

== Writings ==
Rabbi Avraham wrote many books, including a kabbalistic commentary on Masechet Megillah, the Book of Esther a commentary on the Torah, a commentary on the siddur and on the Passover haggadah. However, these have all remained only in manuscript. His only published books are a commentary on Pirkei Avot and the book for which he is best known, Ma'alot HaTorah, which was first printed in 5584 (1824) by his grandson, Rabbi Tzvi Hirsh, and republished seven times in the following 70 years, and subsequently many times more. He even instructed his family to learn the book at least once a month.

=== Ma'alot HaTorah ===
The book Ma'alot HaTorah speaks about greatness and great praise of the Torah and those who learn it. It contains many teachings from the author's brother, the Vilna Gaon. The author cites many words of Chazal from the Talmud and Midrashim and quotes from the Zohar which speak of the value of Torah and its importance.

In the introduction, the author explains the purpose of his essay. He writes that the central path to do repentance is through studying the Torah, and especially nowadays, when fasting and afflictions are less suitable for the majority of the public. For this reason, he wrote his essay which is intended to lead the reader to Torah study, repentance and good and honest behavior.

"The whole point of the protection of repentance is solely through the Torah that elevates... and especially in these generations, because the length of the exile is because of not learning Torah, may the Merciful one protect us, and the exiles gather solely in the merit of the Torah... The Torah also atones for everything... For self-affliction and fasts were for the earlier generations, but the later ones have a weak temperament. The essence repentance is to through strengthening Torah learning all day long... Therefore, I raised my hand in this composition with these words, because my desire is to clarify here, to the best of my knowledge, the virtues of the Torah, as found in the Scriptures and words of the Sages, in the Talmud and Midrashim and words of the Holy Zohar... to awaken the reader from the slumber of time, and to bring to his heart closer to the devotion of the Holy Torah, so that through this they may come to complete repentance, and to all the elevated virtues, and to good and honest behavior, and on this I have founded this book."

== Descendants ==
- Son, Rabbi Eliyahu, head of the beit din of Neustadt- Sugint. His descendants include Rabbi Yonah Reem and his brother, Rabbi Eliyahu Re'em, and Rabbi Raphael Yonah Tikuchinsky.
- Son, Rabbi Gershon, author of "Avodat Hagershuni."
- Son, Rabbi Shmuel (known as "Rabbi Shmuel Hakatan), head of the beit din of Šėta.
- Grandson, Rabbi Shlomo Zalman, author of "Beit Avot," head of the beit din of Neustadt- Sugint.
- Grandson, Rabbi Meir, author of the "Nachalat Avot."
- Grandson, Rabbi Yissachar Ber of Biržai, also known as the Magid of Rotova.
- Great-grandson, Rabbi Meir Michel Rabinovitz, author of "Hameir Laolam."
- Great-grandson, Rabbi Eliyahu Baruch Kammai.
- Great-grandson, Rabbi Eliyahu Loiznon.
