= Jacek Moskwa =

Polish journalist and writer

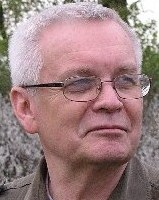
Jacek moskwa

Jacek Moskwa (born 1948) is a Polish journalist and writer. He cooperated with many of the most notable Media in Poland, including the Television News Agency, Życie Warszawy, Gazeta Wyborcza, Rzeczpospolita and Radio Zet.

After 1990, Moskwa for several years worked as a correspondent of the Polish media in Rome and was one of the few Polish journalists accredited at the Vatican.

In 1987, during the second apostolic pilgrimage of Pope John Paul II to Poland, he worked in the press office of the Polish Bishops' Conference. In 1988/1989, he served as the deputy secretary of the Civic Committee under the chairmanship of Lech Wałęsa, leader of the NSZZ "Solidarity". From 1990 to 2005, he was a correspondent for Polish media accredited in Rome and at the Holy See; in this capacity, he made numerous trips on the papal plane, including to Albania, Lebanon, Mexico, the USA, India, Georgia, Jordan, Israel, and Cuba. After returning to Poland, he became the publisher of "Świat Książki" and an editor at TVP – since the beginning of 2010, he has worked exclusively as a writer and independent publicist. He is, among other things, the author of biographical books about Pope John Paul II. Since 1975, he has been a member of the Polish Journalists Association, since 1989 a member of the Polish section of the PEN Club, and since 2003 a member of the Association of Polish Writers (since 2008, Vice-President of the Warsaw Branch and Press Spokesperson of the General Board).

Since May 2010, he has been the Vice-President of the Council of Writers of the Three Seas, an organization uniting literary associations from 26 countries in Europe. He also sits on the Advisory Council of the Press Freedom Monitoring Centre of the Polish Journalists Association. He is a member of the Warsaw Catholic Intellectual Club and from 2014 to 2016, he served on the auditing committee of this association.

== Bibliography ==
- Jacek Moskwa (1977). Dlaczego pan się przyznał?. KAW, Warsaw.
- Jacek Moskwa (1985). Pątnicy : przypowieść. Wydawnictwo Archidiecezji Warszawskiej, Warsaw. ISBN 83-85015-04-3.
- Jacek Moskwa (1987). Papież i kontestatorzy. Michalineum, Warsaw-Kraków. ISBN 83-7019-024-3.
- Jacek Moskwa (1987). Antoni Marylski i Laski. ZNAK, Warsaw. ISBN 83-7006-090-0.
- Jacek Moskwa (2000). Zostań z nami!. Świat Książki, Warsaw. ISBN 83-7227-666-8.
- Jacek Moskwa (2003). Prorok i polityk (Prophet and Politician). Świat Książki, Warsaw. ISBN 83-7391-116-2.
- Jacek Moskwa (2003). Pontifex maximus: 25 lat - 25 tajemnic. Velar, Gorle-Bergamo. ISBN 88-7135-164-9.
- Jacek Moskwa (2004). Ja, Żyd z Pasji (Me, the Jew of The Passion). Sic!, Warsaw. ISBN 83-88807-48-X. - a long interview with Olek Mincer, a Polish Jew to play Nicodemus
- Jacek Moskwa (2005). Jan Paweł II (John Paul II). Bertelsmann Media, Warsaw. - biography of the pope Karol Wojtyła, ]
