= Alexander Süsskind of Grodno =

Historical figure

Alexander Susskind ben Moses of Grodno was a kabbalist of the eighteenth century. He died at Grodno in 1794. He wrote Yesod we-Shoresh ha-'Abodah (The Essence and Root of Worship), Novydvor, 1782, a work frequently republished. It contains directions for the right use, and comprehension of the ritual, the daily Jewish prayers, and those for the Shabbat and Jewish holidays; also divers exegetical articles on Rashi's commentary on the Nevi'im and Ketuvim, and articles on the Holy Land and the Temple in Jerusalem. He also left an ethical will to his sons, which contains admonitions regarding divine service. This work was published in Grodno in 1794.
