= Iwan Tyszkiewicz =

Iwan Tyszkiewicz or Iwan (Jan) Tyszkowic (15?? – 1611) was a Socinian Unitarian executed for blasphemy and heresy by the Polish–Lithuanian Commonwealth at the great marketplace of Warsaw.

== Overview ==
A well-to-do subject of the Polish–Lithuanian Commonwealth, Iwan Tyszkiewicz became a follower of Socinian doctrines and abandoned Roman Catholicism for a Unitarian sect known as the Polish Brethren or Minor Reformed Church and began to eagerly proselytize his new faith - much to the dismay of his Catholic compatriots.

Instructed to swear an oath by the Trinity or on the crucifix, he refused to yield, and was condemned to execution by a Polish-Lithuanian court. The judgment was appealed all the way to the royal court, but the prosecutor insisted on the ultimate penalty. The sovereign concurred, and the jurors under his sway concurred with the verdict.

The execution took place at the great marketplace of Warsaw. Tyszkiewicz's tongue was first removed by the executioner as punishment for speaking blasphemy against God. The ex-Catholic was then burned alive for "blasphemous heresy."
