= Janusz Tazbir =

Polish historian (1927–2016)

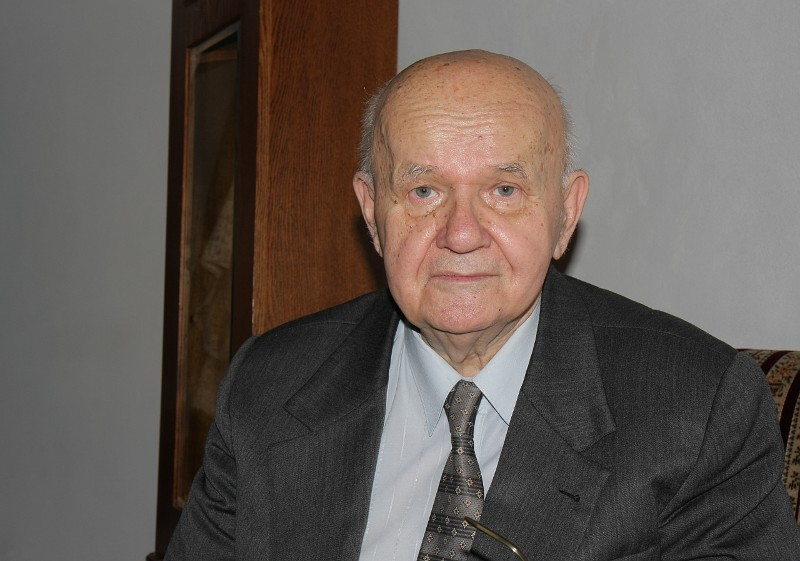
- Born: 5 August 1927; Kałuszyn, Poland
- Died: 3 May 2016 (aged 88); Warsaw, Poland
- Education: University of Warsaw (M.A., Ph.D.)
- Scientific career
- Fields: History

Janusz Tazbir (August 5, 1927 – May 3, 2016) was a Polish historian, specializing in the culture and religion of Poland in the 16th and 17th centuries. He was the Polish-side Chairman of German-Polish Textbook Commission from 1991 to 1997.

== Career ==
Tazbir was a foremost specialist in Old Polish history, and author of over 1000 publications. One of his most famous publications is Państwo bez stosów (A country without stakes) published in 1967. He has also written works popularizing history, as well as on history of literature. His works have been translated into foreign languages, including English and French.

In 1950 he received an M.A. at the Humanities Department of the University of Warsaw. In 1954 he received his Ph.D. and six years later he habilitated. He was editor-in-chief of the annual academic journal Odrodzenie i reformacja w Polsce (The Renaissance and Reformation in Poland) since 1965, and professor of the Polish Academy of Sciences Institute of History since 1966 (he was the director of the institute from 1983 to 1990). He was a full professor since 1973 and a member of Polish Academy of Sciences (Polska Akademia Nauk) since 1989.

He was also the leader of the Science Council of Polski Słownik Biograficzny (Polish Biographical Dictionary).

== Works ==
Selected:

- "Historia Kościoła katolickiego w Polsce (1460 -1795)" (History of Catholic Church in Poland, 1460–1795) (1966)
- "Państwo bez stosów. Szkice z dziejów tolerancji w Polsce w XVI i XVII w." (A country without stakes: Polish religious toleration in the sixteenth and seventeenth centuries (1967) English translation available (1973)
- "Dzieje polskiej tolerancji" (History of Polish tolerance) (1973)
- "Kultura szlachecka w Polsce" (Culture of the Polish nobility) (1978)
- "Spotkania z historią" (Meetings with history) (1979)
- "Tradycje tolerancji religijnej w polsce" (Traditions of religious tolerance in Poland) (1980)
- "Szlaki kultury polskiej) (Paths of Polish culture) (1986)
- "Polska przedmurzem chrześcijanskiej Europy: Mity a rzeczywistość" (Poland as a bulwark of Christian Europe: Myths and reality) (1983), English translation available (1987, ISBN 978-83-223-2254-3)
- "Reformacja, kontreformacja, tolerancja: A to Polska właśnie" (Reformation, counterreformation, tolerance: that's Poland) (1994)
- "W pogoni za Europą" (Chasing Europe) (1998)
- "Okrucieństwo w nowożytnej Europie" (Cruelty in modern Europe) (1999)

== Quote ==
- "In the social sciences, there is a rule that the more someone has written, the more erroneous hypotheses he has created."

== See also ==
- List of Poles
