= Kiev Cossacks insurrection =

Mass peasant movement

Kiev Cossack insurrection
- Part of Cossack uprisings and Crimean War
Date	1855
Location	Kiev and Chernigov governorates, Russian Empire
Result	Russian victory

Belligerents
Russian Empire	Cossacks of the Kiev Governorate

Commanders and leaders
Unknown	Vasyl Bzenko; Mykhailo Haydenko; Petro Shvaika; Ivan Bernadsky †; Mykola Bernadsky †

Casualties and losses
- 36 peasants killed

The Kiev Cossack insurrection was a mass peasant movement in the Kiev Governorate and Chernihiv Governorate in 1855 directed against the national and social policies of the Russian government in Ukraine.

== Preconditions ==
The Kiev (Kyiv) Cossacks arose purely on social grounds, characterized by the desire to restore the Cossacks as a social state and military formation.

The reason for the peasant uprisings was the proclamation of the tsar's manifesto during the Crimean War of 1853–1856, which called for the formation of a people's militia ready to go to war. Among the peasants in the Kiev region, rumors began to spread that by enlisting in the militia ("Cossacks"), they would be freed from serfdom and receive landowners' estates and property. Peasants compiled lists of "free Cossacks", refused to work as serfs or follow the orders of the local administration, and created their own elected self-government bodies ("rural communities").

== Uprising ==
The mass peasant movement began in February 1855 in Vasylkiv County and soon covered 8 of 12 counties of Kiev Governorate (over 500 villages), as well as Konotop County of Chernihiv Governorate (including the villages of Velykyi and Malyi Sambir, Karabutove). The leaders of the Kiev Cossacks included V. Bzenko, I. and M. Bernadsky, M. Haydenko, and P. Shvaika. In some areas, the insurgents took in their hands the management of land properties and organized own guards.

To suppress the "Cossacks", the Russian government sent regular troops. Bloody clashes between the peasants and the army took place in a number of villages, the largest of which were in the towns of Korsun and Tagancha (Kaniv County; now a village in the Kaniv District of Cherkasy region) and the villages of Berezna (Skvyra County), Bykova Hrebla (Vasylkiv County), and Yablunivka.

== Aftermath ==
The uprising was suppressed by government troops, resulting in numerous victims. Its organizers were sentenced to death or deported to Siberia.

== See also ==
- Free Cossacks
