= Nobleman's Republic =

The term Nobleman's Republic can refer to:

- History of Poland (1569–1795)
- Golden Liberty, the political system of that time in Poland
