= History of Poland in the early modern period (1569–1795) =

The early modern era of Polish history follows the Late Middle Ages. Historians use the term early modern to refer to the period beginning in approximately 1500 AD and lasting until around the Napoleonic Wars in 1800 AD.

The Nihil novi act adopted by the Polish diet in 1505 transferred legislative power from the king to the diet. This event marked the beginning of the period known as the "Nobles' Democracy" (Polish: Demokracja szlachecka) or "Nobles' Commonwealth" (Polish: Rzeczpospolita szlachecka). The state was ruled by the "free and equal" Polish nobility or szlachta, albeit in intense, and at times destabilizing, competition with the Jagiellon and then elective kings.

The Union of Lublin of 1569 constituted the Polish–Lithuanian Commonwealth, a more closely merged continuation of the already existing personal union of the Crown of Poland and the Grand Duchy of Lithuania. The beginning of the Commonwealth coincided with the period of Poland's greatest territorial expansion, power, civilizational advancement and prosperity. The Polish–Lithuanian state had become an influential player in Europe and a vital cultural entity, spreading Western culture eastward.

Following the Reformation gains accompanied by religious toleration, the Catholic Church embarked on an ideological counter-offensive and Counter-Reformation claimed many converts from Protestant circles. The disagreements over and the difficulties with the assimilation of the eastern Ruthenian populations of the Commonwealth had become clearly discernible; an attempt to settle the issue was made in the religious Union of Brest. On the military front, a series of Cossack uprisings took place.

The Commonwealth, assertive militarily under King Stephen Báthory, suffered from dynastic distractions during the reigns of the Vasa kings Sigismund III and Władysław IV. It had also become a playground of internal conflicts, in which the kings, powerful magnates and factions of nobility were the main actors. The Commonwealth fought wars with Russia, Sweden and the Ottoman Empire.

The situation, however, soon radically deteriorated. From 1648 the Cossack Khmelnytsky Uprising engulfed the south and east, and was soon followed by a Swedish invasion, which raged through core Polish lands. Warfare with the Cossacks and Russia left Ukraine divided, with the eastern part, lost by the Commonwealth, becoming the Tsardom's dependency. John III Sobieski, fighting protracted wars with the Ottoman Empire, revived the Commonwealth's military might once more, in the process helping decisively in 1683 to deliver Vienna from a Turkish onslaught.

The Commonwealth, subjected to almost constant warfare until 1720, suffered devastating population losses, massive damage to its economy and social structure. The government became ineffective because of large scale internal conflicts (e.g. Lubomirski's Rokosz against John II Casimir and other confederations), corrupted legislative processes (liberum veto) and manipulation by foreign interests. The "ruling" nobility class fell under control of a handful of powerful families with established territorial domains. The reigns of two kings of the Saxon Wettin dynasty, Augustus II and Augustus III, brought the Commonwealth further disintegration.

The Polish-Lithuanian state was dominated by the Russian Empire from the time of Peter the Great. This foreign control reached its climax under Catherine the Great, and involved at that time also the Kingdom of Prussia and the Austrian Habsburg monarchy. During the later part of the 18th century the Commonwealth recovered economically, developed culturally and attempted fundamental internal reforms. The reform activity provoked hostile reaction and eventually military response on the part of the neighboring powers. The royal election of 1764 resulted in the reign of Stanisław August Poniatowski.

The Bar Confederation of 1768 was a szlachta rebellion directed against Russia and the Polish king. It was brought under control and followed in 1772 by the First Partition of the Commonwealth, a permanent encroachment on the outer Commonwealth provinces by Russia, Prussia and Austria.

The Great, or Four-Year Sejm was convened by Stanisław August in 1788. The Sejm's landmark achievement was the passing of the Constitution of May 3, 1791, considered the first in modern Europe. The constitutional reform generated strong opposition from conservative circles in the Commonwealth's upper nobility and from Catherine II.

The nobility's Targowica Confederation appealed to Empress Catherine for help and in May 1792 the Russian army entered the territory of the Commonwealth. The defensive war fought by the forces of the Commonwealth ended when the King, convinced of the futility of resistance, capitulated by joining the Targowica Confederation. Russia and Prussia in 1793 arranged for and executed the Second Partition of the Commonwealth, which left the country with critically reduced territory, practically incapable of independent existence.

Reformers and patriots were soon preparing for a national insurrection. Tadeusz Kościuszko, chosen as its leader, on March 24, 1794, in Cracow (Kraków) declared a national uprising. Kościuszko emancipated and enrolled in his army many peasants, but the hard-fought insurrection ended in suppression by the forces of Russia and Prussia. The third and final partition of the Commonwealth was undertaken again by all three partitioning powers, and in 1795 the Polish–Lithuanian Commonwealth ceased to exist.

== Early elective monarchy ==
=== Non-hereditary royal succession ===
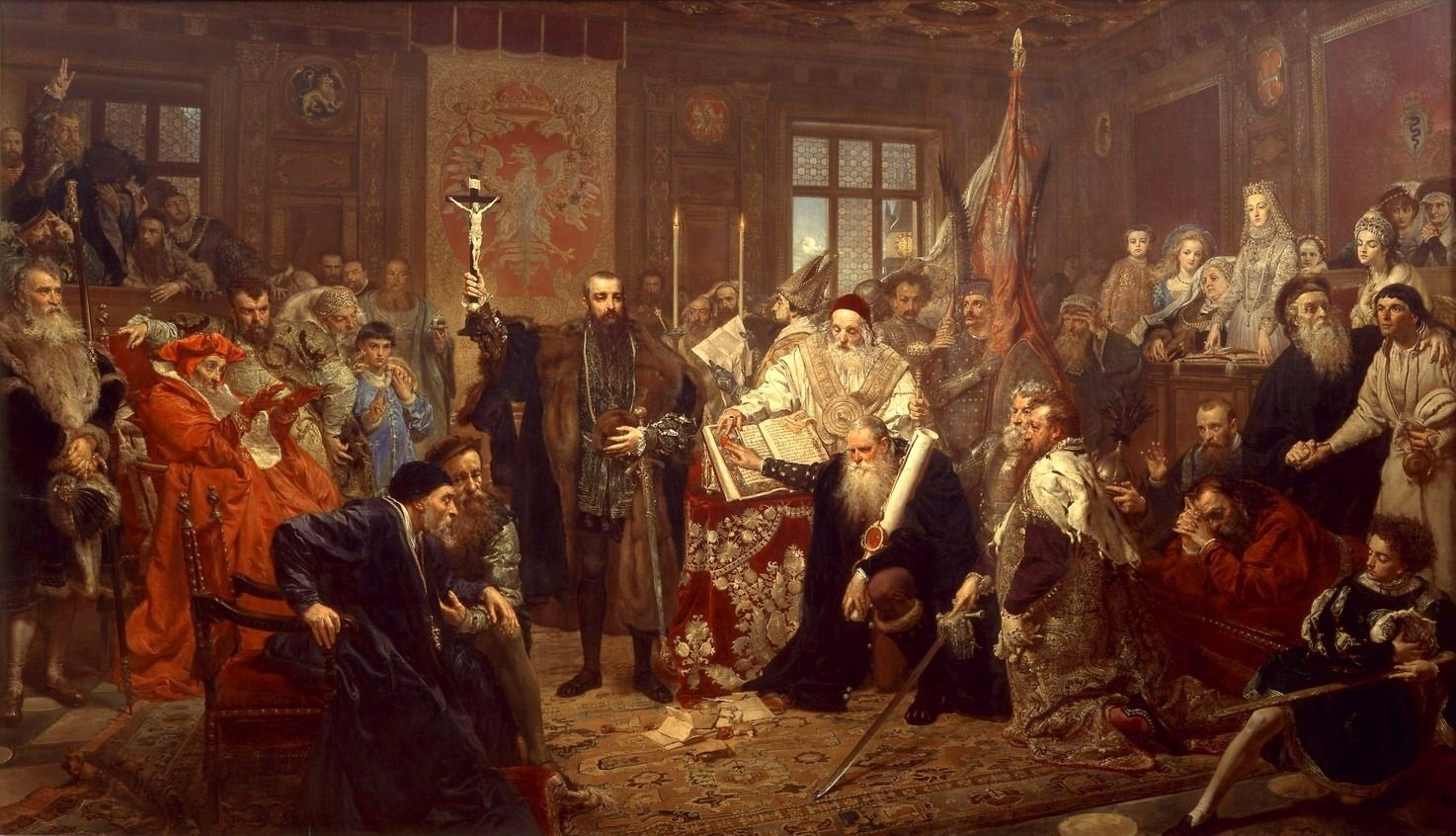
Union of Lublin of 1569. Oil on canvas by Jan Matejko, 1869, National Museum in Warsaw.

The death of Sigismund II Augustus in 1572 ended the nearly two centuries of the rule of the Jagiellon dynasty in Poland. It was followed by a three-year interregnum period, during which the Polish nobility (szlachta) was searching for ways to continue the governance process and elect a new monarch. Lower szlachta was now included in the selection process and adjustments were made to the constitutional system. The power of the monarch was further circumscribed in favor of the expanding noble class, which sought to ensure its future domination.

Each king had to sign the so-called Henrician Articles (named after Henry of Valois, the first post-Jagiellon king), which were the basis of the political system of Poland, and the pacta conventa, which were various further personal obligations of the chosen king. From that point, the king was effectively a partner with the nobility, a top member of the diet (sejm), and was constantly supervised by a group of upper-rank nobles, senators from sejm's upper chamber.

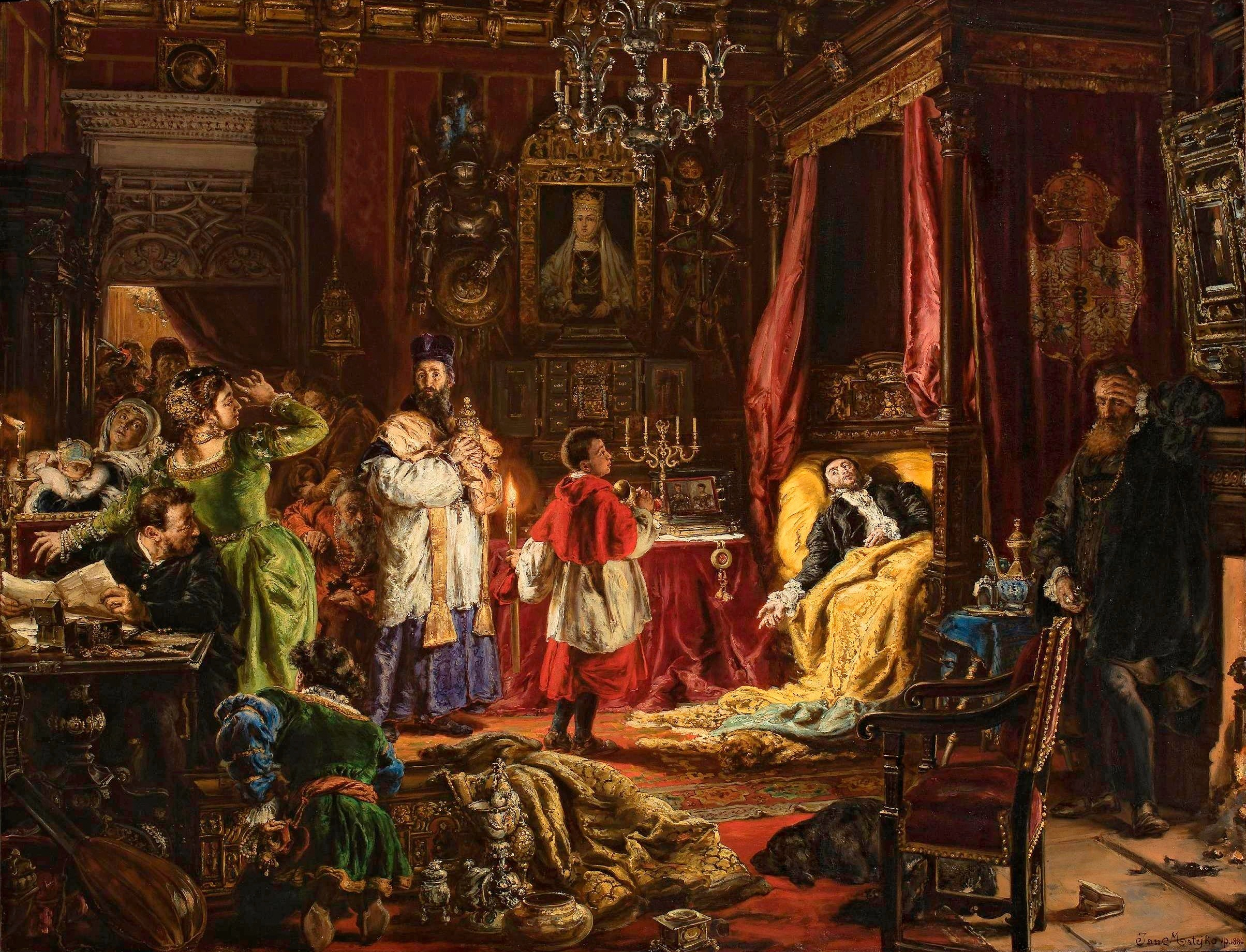
Death of Sigismund II Augustus at Knyszyn (on 6 July 1572, the end of the Jagiellon dynasty rule), by Jan Matejko

The disappearance of the ruling dynasty and its replacement with a non-hereditary elective monarchy made the constitutional system much more unstable. With each election the noble electors wanted more power for themselves and less for the monarch, although there were practical limits to how much the kings could be constrained. A semi-permanent power struggle resulted, to which the magnates and lesser szlachta added their own constant manipulations and bickering and authority eroded from the government's center. Eventually foreign states had taken advantage of the vacuum and replaced the nobility of the Commonwealth as the real arbiter of royal elections and of overall power in Poland-Lithuania.

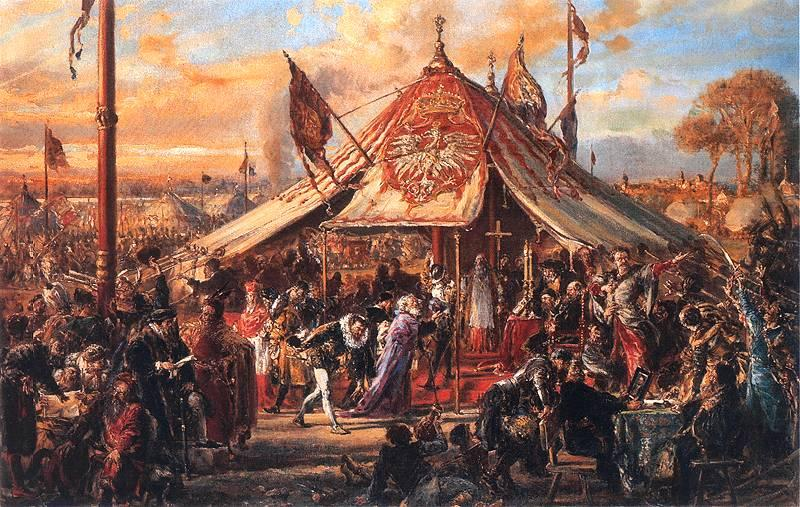
The Republic at Zenith of Power. Golden Liberty. Royal election in 1573. By Jan Matejko.

In its periodic opportunities to fill the throne, the szlachta exhibited a preference for foreign candidates who would not found another strong dynasty. This policy produced monarchs who were either ineffective or in constant debilitating conflict with the nobility. The kings of alien origin were initially unfamiliar with the internal dynamics of the Commonwealth, had remained distracted by the politics of their native countries, and often inclined to subordinate the interests of the Commonwealth to those of their own country and ruling house.

=== Henry of Valois (1573–1574) ===
In April 1573, Sigismund's sister Anna, the sole heir to the crown, convinced the Sejm to elect the French prince Henry of Valois as king. Her marriage with Henry was to further legitimize Henry's rule, but less than a year after his coronation, Henry fled Poland to succeed his brother Charles IX as King of France.

=== Stephen Báthory (1576–1586) ===
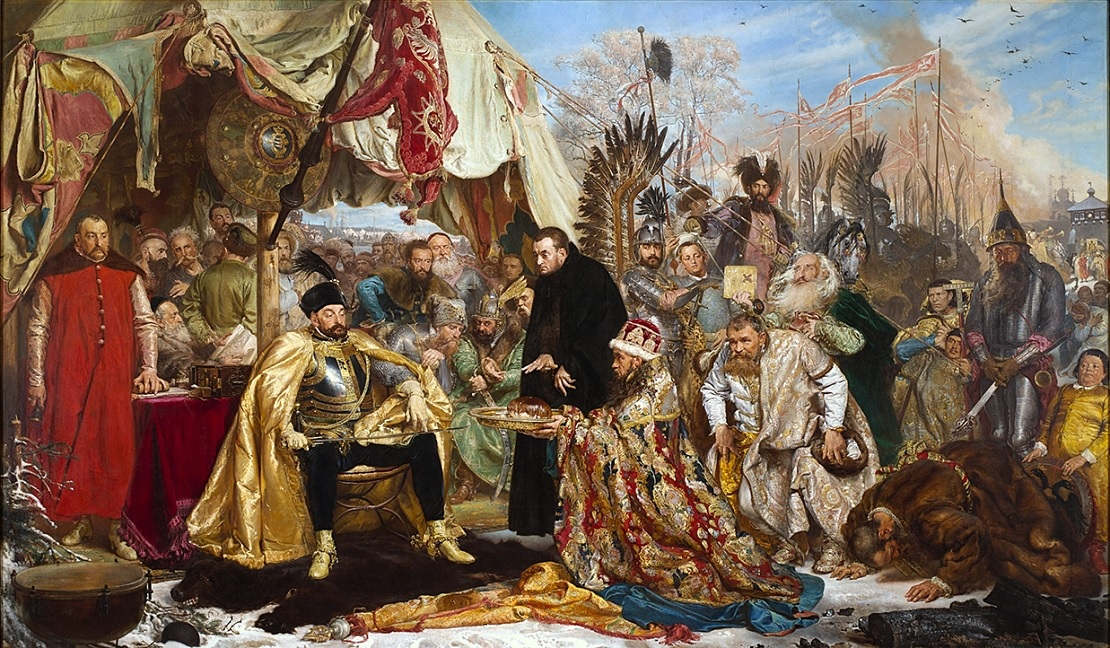
Báthory at Psków, siege of the city

The able and militarily as well as domestically assertive Transylvanian Stephen Báthory (1576–1586) counts among the few more highly regarded elective kings.

During the Livonian War (1558–1582), fought between Ivan the Terrible of Russia and Poland-Lithuania, Pskov was besieged by Polish forces. The city was not captured, but Báthory, with his Chancellor Jan Zamoyski, led the Polish army in a decisive campaign and forced Russia to return territories previously taken, gaining Livonia and Polotsk. In 1582, the war ended with the Truce of Jam Zapolski.

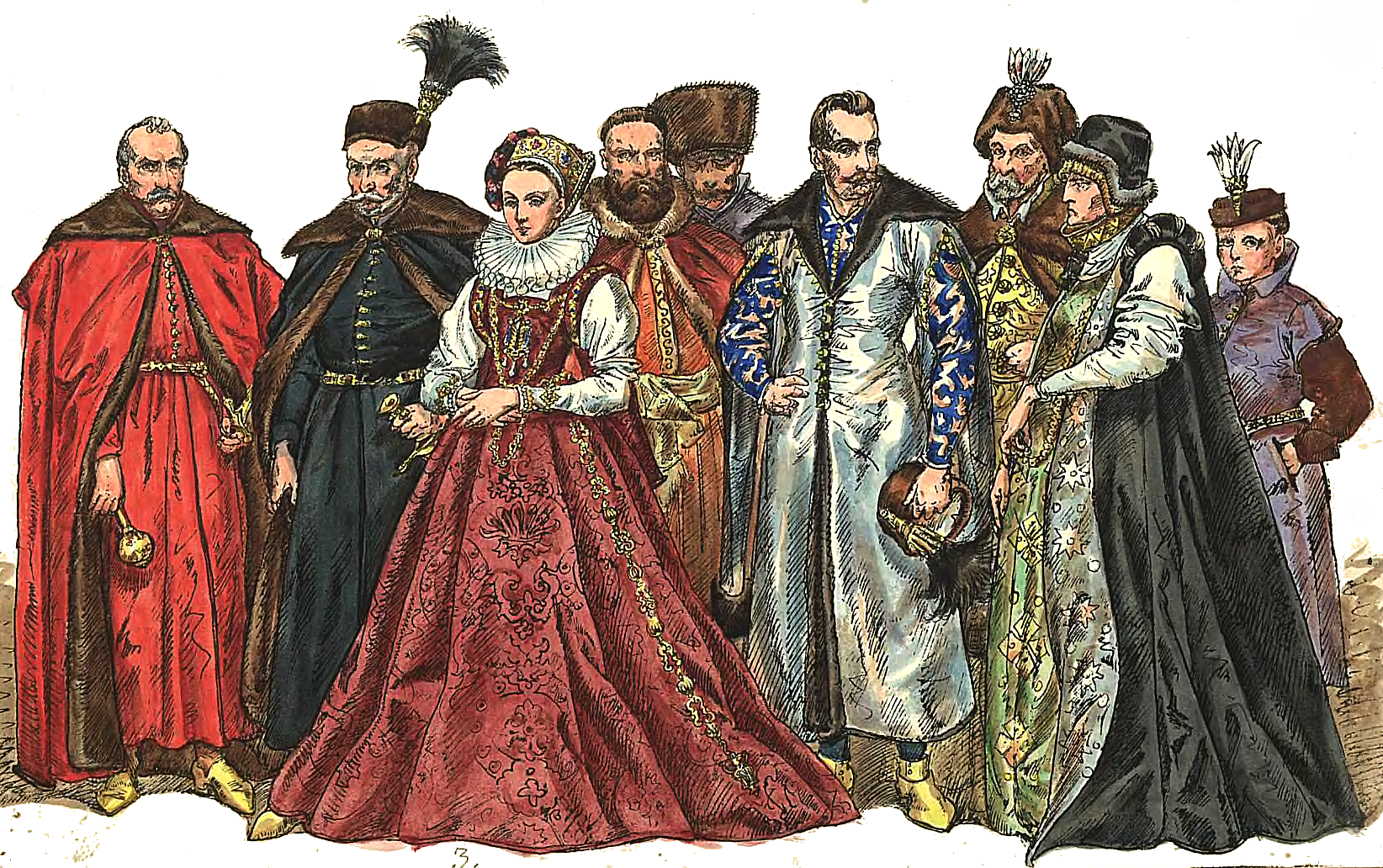
Polish magnates 1576–1586. For his paintings Jan Matejko did research on historical costumes.

The Commonwealth forces retrieved most of the lost provinces. At the end of Báthory's reign, Poland ruled two main Baltic Sea ports: Danzig (Gdańsk), controlling the Vistula River trade and Riga, controlling the Daugava River trade. Both cities were among the largest in the country.

==== War of the Polish Succession ====
Stephen Báthory planned a Christian alliance against the Islamic Ottomans. He proposed an anti-Ottoman alliance with Russia, which he considered necessary for his anti-Ottoman crusade. Russia however was heading for its Time of Troubles and he could not find a partner there. When Báthory died, there was a year-long interregnum. Emperor Mathias' brother, Archduke Maximilian III, tried to claim the Polish throne, but was defeated at Byczyna during the War of the Polish Succession (1587–1588). Sigismund III Vasa became the Commonwealth's next king, the first of the three rulers from the Swedish House of Vasa.

== House of Vasa ==
=== Sigismund III Vasa (1587–1632) ===
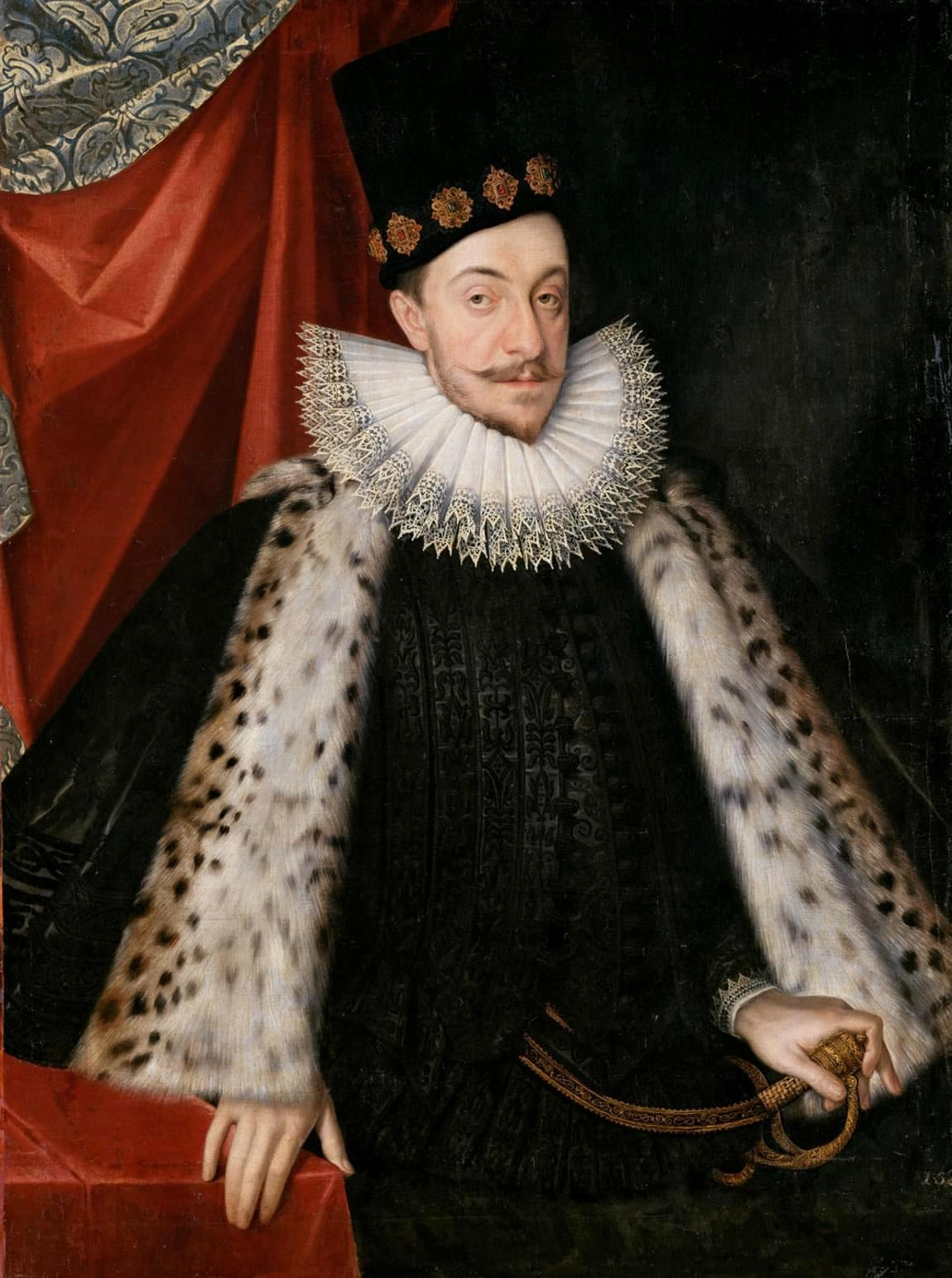
King Sigismund III Vasa, painted by Martin Kober

Sigismund III Vasa was King of Poland 1587–1632 and King of Sweden 1592–1599. He was the son of John III Vasa of Sweden and Catherine, the daughter of Sigismund I the Old of Poland. He annoyed the Polish nobles by deliberately dressing in Spanish and other Western European styles (including French hosiery). An ardent Catholic, Sigismund III was determined to win the Swedish crown and bring Sweden back to Catholicism. Subsequently, Sigismund III involved Poland in unnecessary and unpopular wars with Sweden during which the diet refused him money and soldiers and Sweden seized Livonia and Prussia.

The first few years of Sigismund's reign (until 1598) saw Poland and Sweden united in a personal union that made the Baltic Sea an internal lake. However, a rebellion in Sweden started the chain of events that would involve the Commonwealth in more than a century of warfare with Sweden.

The Commonwealth at its maximum extent

The Catholic Church embarked on an ideological counter-offensive and Counter-Reformation claimed many converts from Protestant circles. The Union of Brest split the Eastern Christians of the Commonwealth. In order to further Catholicism, the Uniate Church (acknowledging papal supremacy but following Eastern ritual and Slavonic liturgy) was created at the Synod of Brest in 1596. The Uniates drew many followers away from the Orthodox Church in the Commonwealth's eastern territories.

Sigismund's attempts to introduce absolutism, then becoming prevalent in the rest of Europe, and his goal of reacquiring the throne of Sweden for himself, resulted in a rebellion of the szlachta (gentry). In 1607, the Polish nobility threatened to suspend the agreements with their elected king but did not attempt his overthrow.

For ten years between 1619 and 1629, the Commonwealth was at its greatest geographical extent in history. In 1619, the Russo-Polish Truce of Deulino came into effect, whereby Russia conceded Commonwealth control over Smolensk and several other border territories. In 1629, the Swedish-Polish Truce of Altmark took place; the Commonwealth ceded to Sweden most of Livonia, which the Swedes had invaded in 1626.

Sigismund III Vasa failed to strengthen the Commonwealth or to solve its internal problems; he concentrated on futile attempts to regain his former Swedish throne.

==== Commonwealth wars with Sweden and Moscow ====
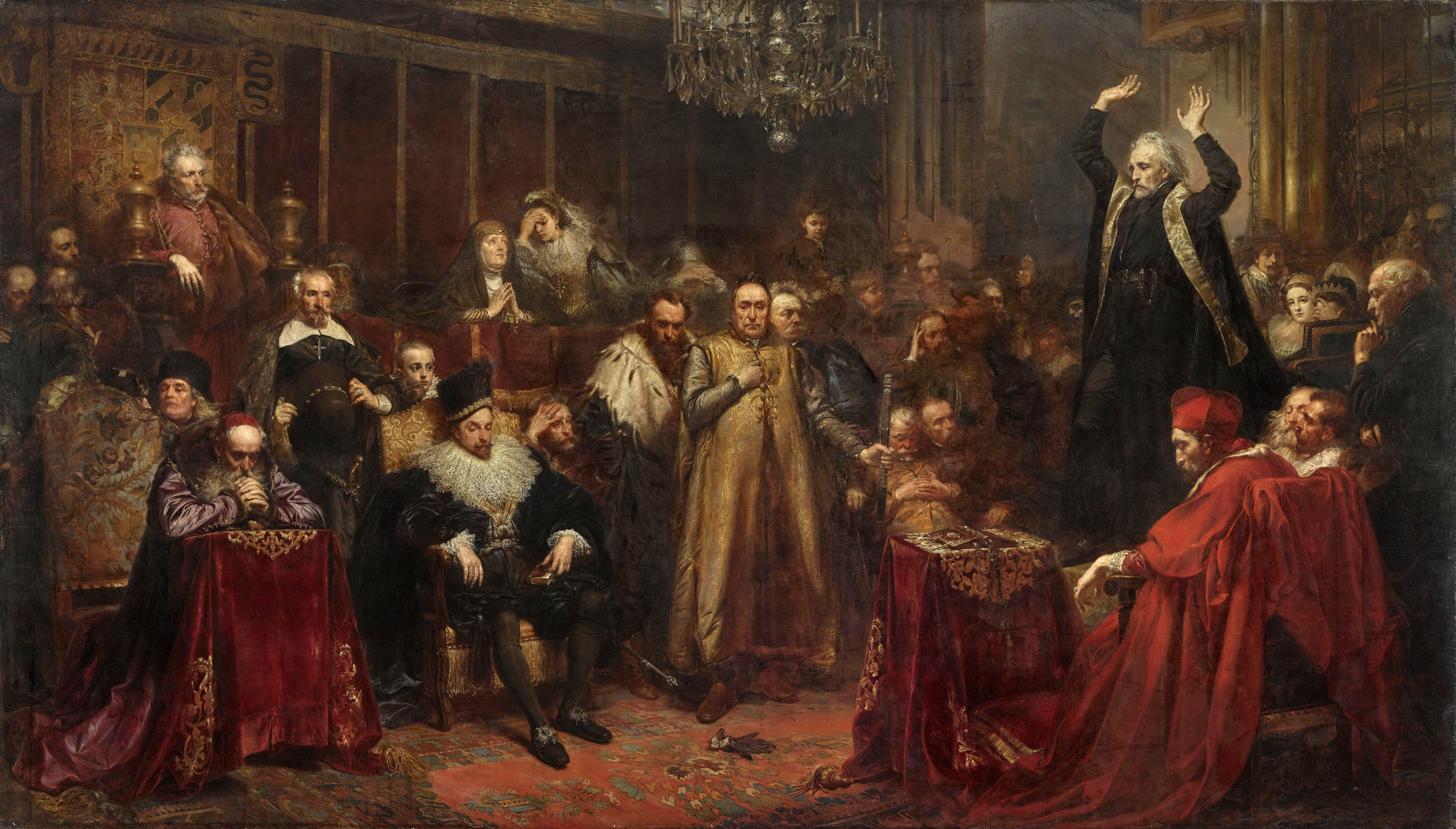
Sermon of Skarga. Piotr Skarga (1536-1612) was a preacher and polemicist.

Sigismund’s desire to reclaim the Swedish throne drove him into prolonged military adventures waged against Sweden under Charles IX and later also Russia. In 1598, Sigismund tried to defeat Charles with a mixed army from Sweden and Poland, but was defeated in the Battle of Stångebro.

As the Tsardom of Russia went through its "Time of Troubles," Poland failed to capitalize on the situation. Military campaigns undertaken brought Poland at times close to a conquest of Russia and the Baltic coast during the Time of Troubles and False Dimitris, but military burden imposed by the ongoing rivalry also along other frontiers (the Ottoman Empire and Sweden) prevented this from being accomplished. After prolonged war with Russia, Polish forces occupied Moscow in 1610. The office of tsar, then vacant in Russia, was offered to Sigismund's son, Władysław. Sigismund, however, opposed his son's accession as tsar, as he hoped to obtain the Russian throne for himself. Two years later the Poles were driven out of Moscow and Poland lost an opportunity for a Polish-Russian union.

Poland escaped the Thirty Years' War (1618–1648), which ravaged everything to the west, especially Prussia. In 1618, the Elector of Brandenburg became hereditary ruler of the Duchy of Prussia on the Baltic coast. From then on, Poland's link to the Baltic Sea was bordered on both sides by two provinces of the same German state.

==== Southern wars ====
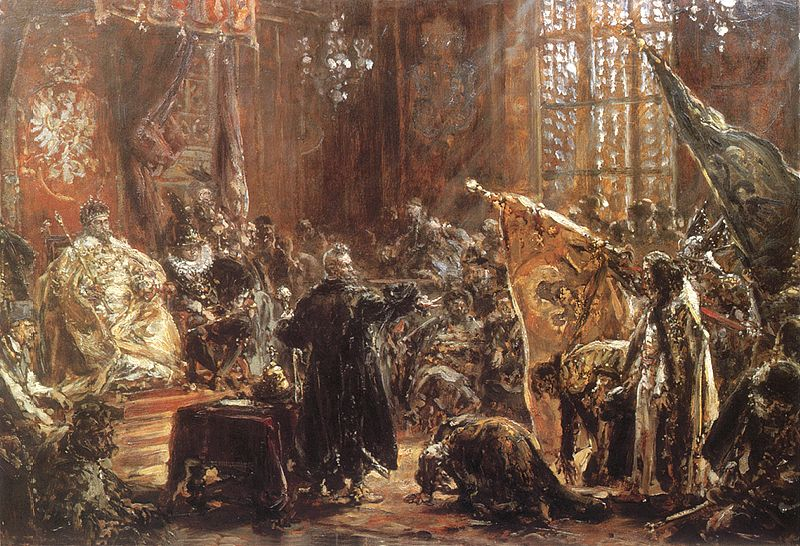
Russia's Times of Troubles and Polish hegemony: Abdicated Vasili IV compelled to kneel before King Sigismund III Vasa in Warsaw in 1611

The Commonwealth viewed itself as the "bulwark of the Christendom" and together with the Habsburgs and the Republic of Venice stood in the way of the Ottoman plans of European conquests. Since the second half of the 16th century, the Polish-Ottomans relations were worsened by the escalation of Cossack-Tatar border warfare, which turned the entire border region between the Commonwealth and the Ottoman Empire into a semi-permanent warzone. A constant threat from Crimean Tatars supported the appearance of Cossackdom.

In 1595, magnates of the Polish–Lithuanian Commonwealth intervened in the affairs of Moldavia. This started a series of conflicts that would soon spread to Transylvania, Wallachia and Hungary, when the forces of the Polish magnates clashed with the forces backed by the Ottoman Empire and occasionally the Habsburgs, all competing for the domination over that region.

With the Commonwealth engaged on its northern and eastern borders with nearly constant conflicts against Sweden and Russia, its armies were spread thin. The southern wars culminated in the Polish defeat at the Battle of Cecora in 1620. The Commonwealth was forced to renounce all claims to Moldavia, Transylvania, Wallachia and Hungary.

==== Religious and social tensions ====
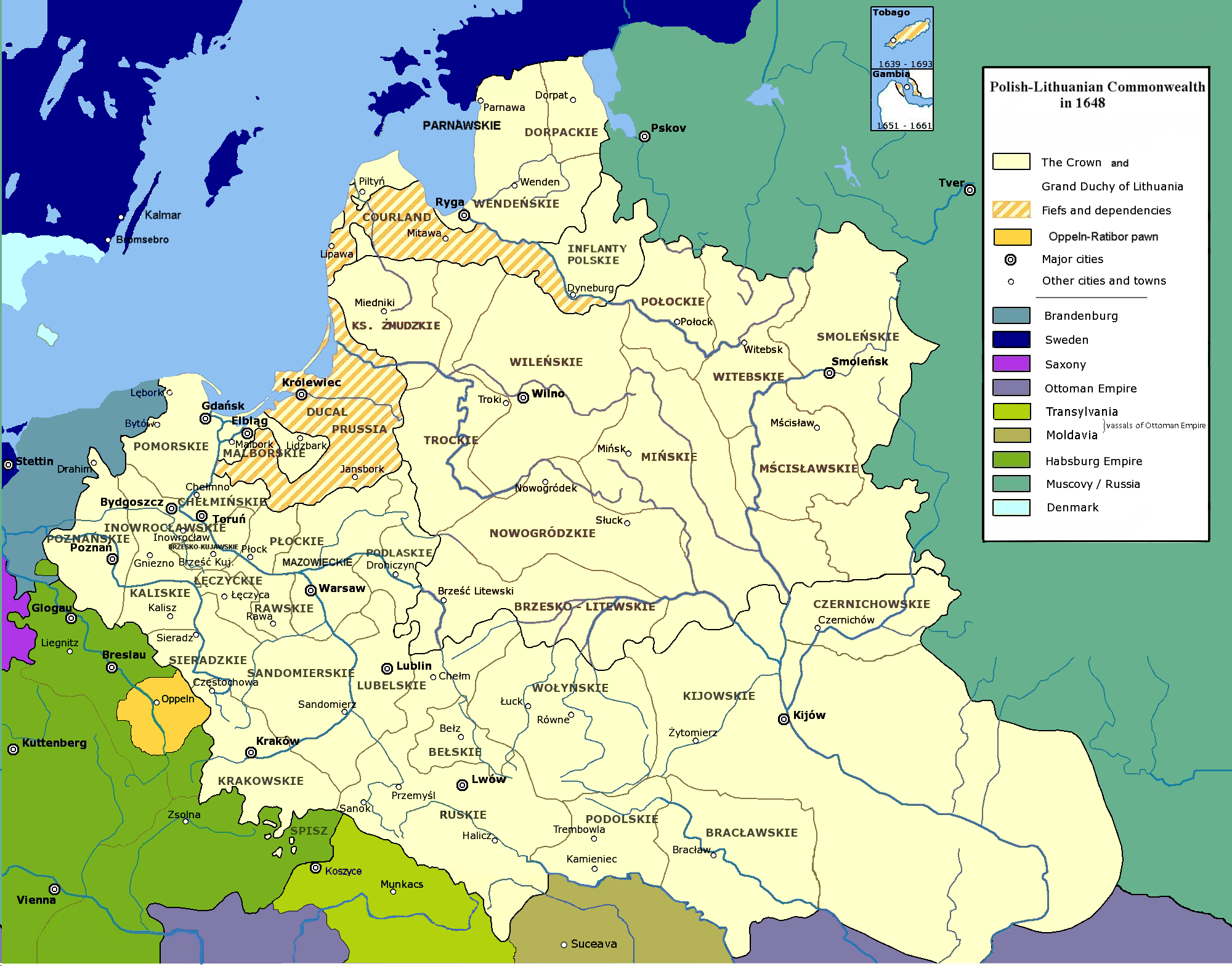
Polish–Lithuanian Commonwealth in 1620

The population of Poland-Lithuania was neither overwhelmingly Roman Catholic nor Polish. This circumstance resulted from the federation with the Grand Duchy of Lithuania, where East Slavic Ruthenian populations predominated. In the days of the "Republic of Nobles", to be Polish was much less an indication of ethnicity than of rank; it was a designation largely reserved for the landed noble class, which included members of Polish and non-Polish origin alike. Generally speaking, the ethnically non-Polish noble families of the Grand Duchy of Lithuania gradually adopted the Polish language and culture.

As a result, in the eastern territories of the Kingdom the Polish-speaking landed nobility dominated over the peasantry, whose great majority was neither Polish nor Catholic. Moreover, the decades of peace brought huge colonization efforts to Ukraine, which heightened tensions between peasants, Jews and nobles. The tensions were aggravated by the conflicts between the Orthodox and Greek Catholic (both Church Slavonic liturgy) churches following the Union of Brest and by several Cossack uprisings. In the west and north of the country, cities had large German minorities, often of reformed beliefs. According to the Risāle-yi Tatar-i Leh (an account of the Lipka Tatars written for Suleiman the Magnificent by an anonymous Polish Muslim during a stay in Istanbul in 1557–8, on his way to Mecca) there were 100 Lipka Tatar settlements with mosques in Poland. In 1672, the Tatar subjects rose up in an open rebellion against the Commonwealth.

=== Władysław IV Vasa (1632–1648) ===
During the reign of Sigismund's son, Władysław IV Vasa, the Cossacks in Ukraine revolted against Poland; wars with Russia and Turkey weakened the country; and szlachta obtained new privileges, mainly exemption from income tax.

Władysław IV aimed to achieve many military goals, including conquests of Russia, Sweden and Turkey. His reign is that of many small victories, few of them bringing anything worthwhile to the Commonwealth. He was once elected a Russian tsar, but never had any control over Russian territories. Like his father, Władysław was involved in Swedish dynastic ambitions. He failed to strengthen the Commonwealth or prevent the crippling events of the Khmelnytsky Uprising and the Deluge that devastated the Commonwealth from 1648 onward.

=== John Casimir Vasa (1648–1668) ===
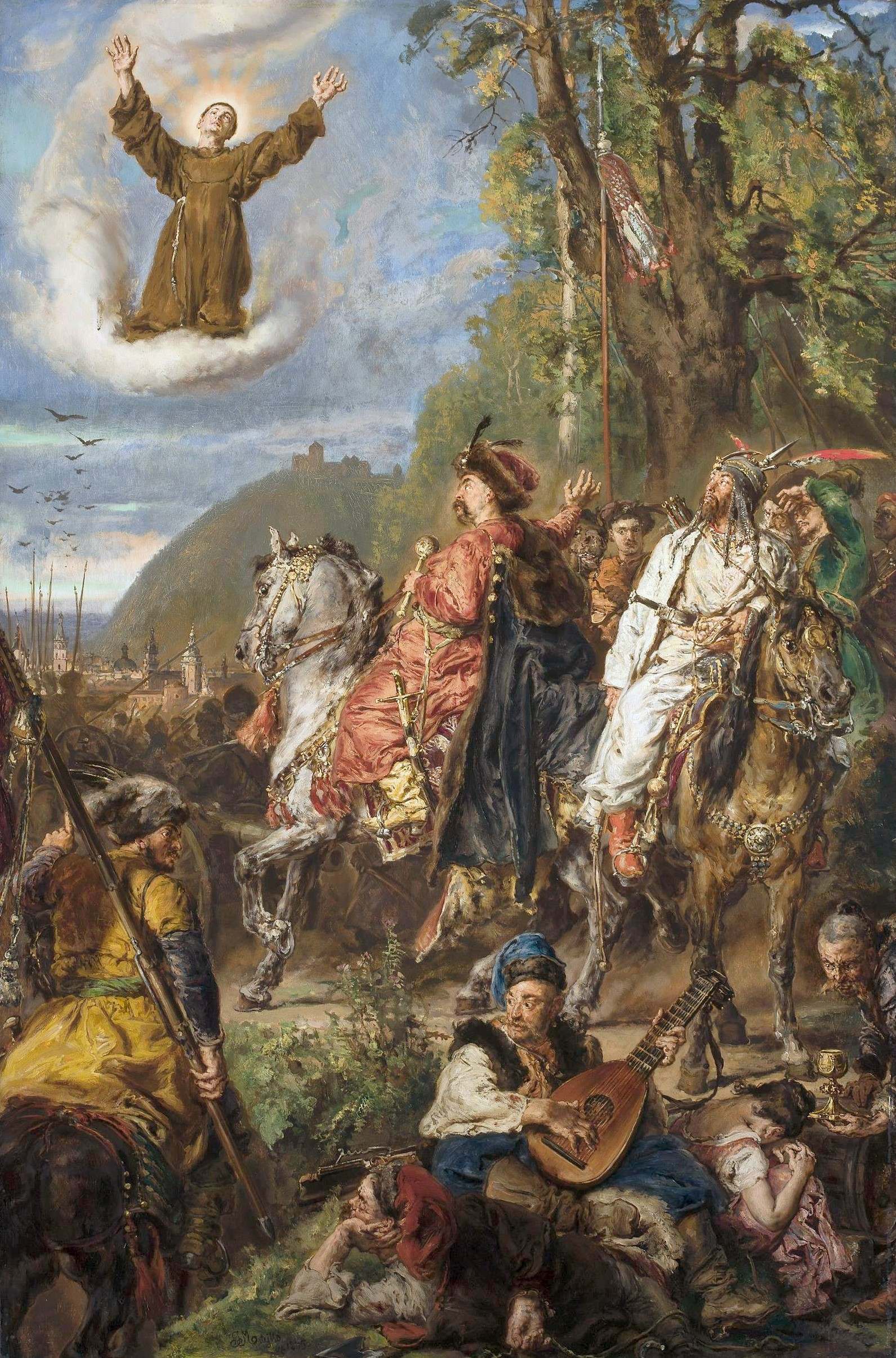
Bohdan Khmelnytsky with Tugay Bey at Lwów

The reign of Władysław's brother John Casimir, the last of the Vasas, was dominated by the culmination in the war with Sweden, the groundwork for which was laid down by the two previous Vasa kings. In 1660, John Casimir was forced to renounce his claims to the Swedish throne and acknowledge Swedish sovereignty over Livonia and city of Riga.

Under John Casimir, the Cossacks grew in power and at times were able to defeat the Poles; the Swedes occupied much of Poland, including Warsaw, the capital; and the King, abandoned or betrayed by his subjects, had to seek temporary refuge in Silesia. As a result of the wars with the Cossacks and Russia, the Commonwealth lost Kiev, Smolensk, and all the areas east of the Dnieper River by the Treaty of Andrusovo (1667). During John Casimir's reign, East Prussia successfully renounced its formal status as a fief of Poland. Internally, the process of disintegration started. The nobles, making their own alliances with foreign powers, pursued independent policies; the rebellion of Jerzy Lubomirski shook the throne.

John Casimir, a broken, disillusioned man, abdicated the Polish throne on 16 September 1668 amid internal anarchy and strife and returned to France, where he joined the Jesuit order and became a monk. He died in 1672.

==== Khmelnytsky Uprising (1648–1654) ====
The Khmelnytsky Uprising, by far the largest of the Cossack uprisings, proved disastrous for the Commonwealth. The Cossacks, allied with the Tatars, defeated the forces of the Commonwealth in several battles, the Commonwealth scored a major victory at Berestechko, but the Polish-Lithuanian empire ended up "fatally wounded". The easternmost parts of its territory were effectively lost to Russia, which resulted in a long-term shift in the balance of power. In the short-term the country was weakened at the moment of the invasion by Sweden.

==== The Deluge (1648–1667) ====
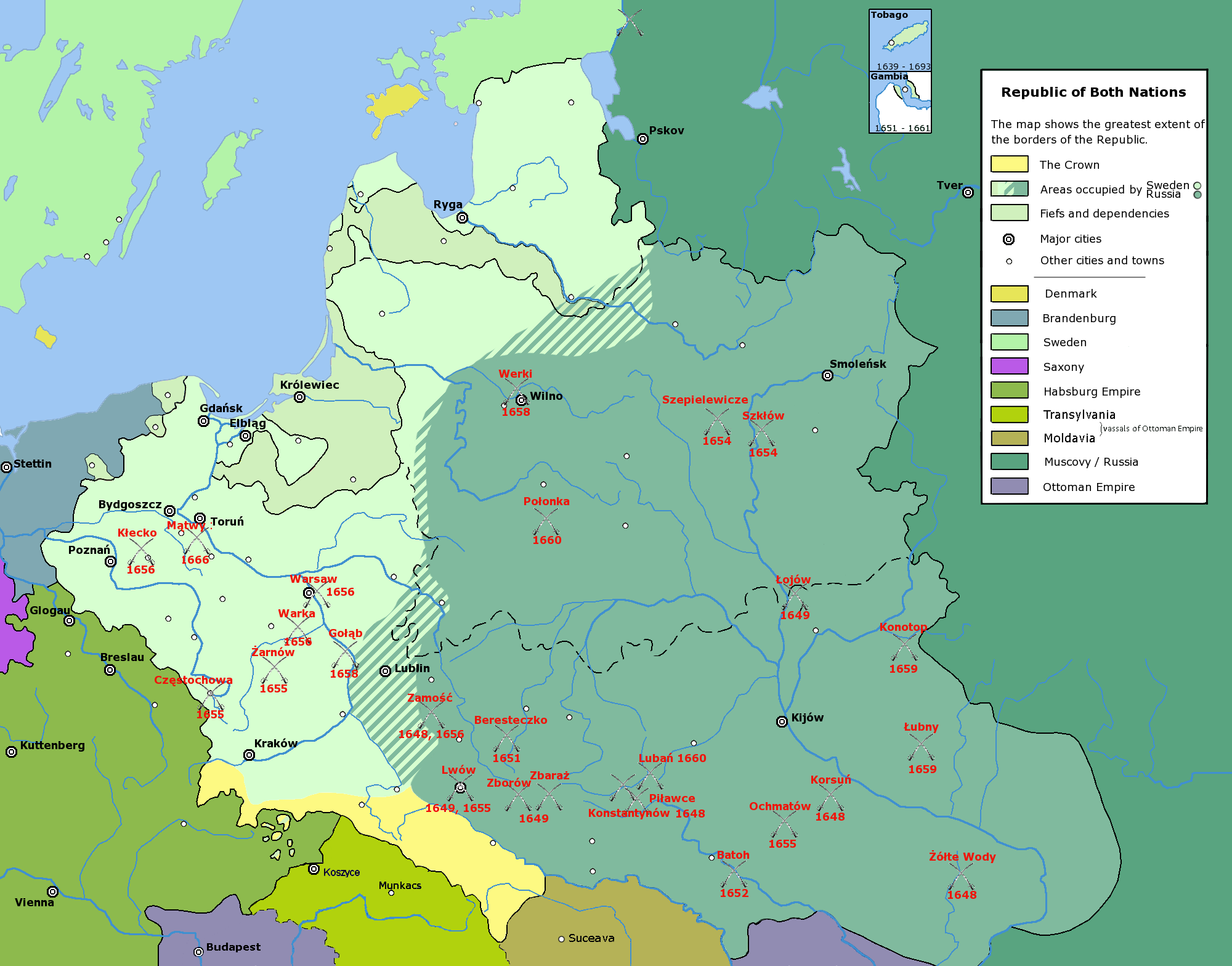
Occupation of the Commonwealth by Sweden, Russia, Brandenburg and the Cossacks

Although Poland-Lithuania was unaffected by the Thirty Years' War (1618–1648), the following two decades subjected the nation to one of its worst trials ever. This colorful but ruinous interval, the stuff of legend and popular historical novels of Nobel laureate Henryk Sienkiewicz, became known as potop, or the Deluge, for the magnitude and suddenness of its hardships. The emergency began when the Ukrainian Cossacks rose in revolt and declared an independent state based in the vicinity of Kiev, allied with the Crimean Tatars and the Ottoman Empire. Their leader Bohdan Khmelnytsky defeated Polish armies in 1648 and 1652, and after the Cossacks concluded the Treaty of Pereyaslav with Russia in 1654, Tsar Alexis overran the entire eastern part of the Commonwealth (Ukraine) to Lwów (Lviv). Taking advantage of Poland's preoccupation in the east and weakness, Charles X Gustav of Sweden intervened. Most of the Polish nobility along with the Polish vassal Frederick William of Brandenburg-Prussia agreed to recognize him as king after he promised to drive out the Russians. However, the Swedish troops embarked on an orgy of looting and destruction, which caused the Polish populace to rise up in revolt. The Swedes overran the remainder of Poland except for Lwów and Danzig (Gdańsk).

Poland-Lithuania rallied to recover most of its losses from the Swedes. In exchange for breaking the alliance with Sweden, Frederick William, the ruler of Ducal Prussia, was released from his vassalage and became a de facto independent sovereign, while much of the Polish Protestant nobility went over to the side of the Swedes. Under Hetman Stefan Czarniecki, the Poles and Lithuanians had driven the Swedes from the Commonwealth's territory by 1657. The armies of Frederick William intervened and were also defeated. Frederick William's rule over East Prussia was recognized, although Poland retained the right of succession until 1773.

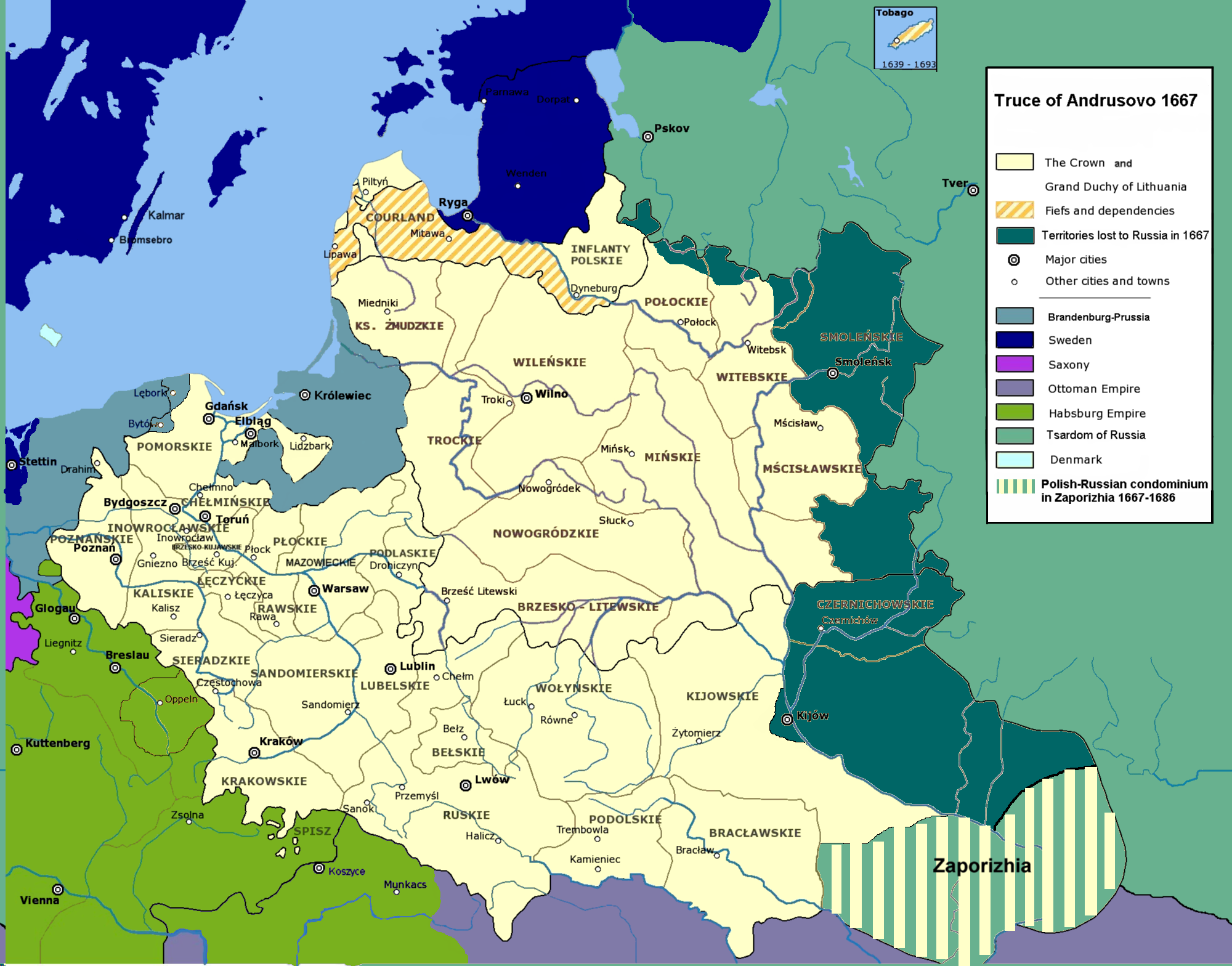
The loss of lands to Russia in the 1667 Truce of Andrusovo (dark green) forever changed the balance of power in Eastern Europe

The thirteen-year struggle over control of Ukraine included an attempted formal union of Ukraine with the Commonwealth as an equal partner (1658) and Polish military successes in 1660–1662. This was not enough to keep eastern Ukraine. Under the pressure of continuing Ukrainian unrest and the threat of a Turkish-Tatar intervention, the Commonwealth and Russia signed in 1667 an agreement in the village of Andrusovo near Smolensk, according to which eastern Ukraine (left bank of the Dnieper River) now belonged to Russia. Kiev was also leased to Russia for two years, but never returned and eventually Poland recognized Russian control of the city.

The potop wars episode inflicted irremediable damage and contributed heavily to the ultimate demise of the state. Held responsible for the greatest disaster in Polish history, John Casimir abdicated in 1668. The population of the Commonwealth had been reduced by a staggering 1/3, by military casualties, slave raids, plague epidemics, and mass murders of civilians. Most of Poland's cities were reduced to rubble, and the nation's economic base was decimated. The war had been paid for by large-scale minting of worthless currency, causing runaway inflation. Religious feelings had also been inflamed by the conflict, ending tolerance of non-Catholic beliefs. Henceforth, the Commonwealth would be on the strategic defensive facing hostile and increasingly more powerful neighbors.

==== Commonwealth after the Deluge ====
In the Treaty of Oliva in 1660, John Casimir finally renounced his claims to the Swedish crown, which ended the feud between Sweden and the Commonwealth and the accompanying string of wars between those countries (War against Sigismund (1598–1599), Polish–Swedish wars (1600–1629) and the Northern War (1655–1660)).

After the Truce of Andrusovo of 1667 and the Eternal Peace Treaty of 1686, the Commonwealth lost left-bank Ukraine to Russia.

Polish culture and the Uniate East Slavic Greek Catholic Church gradually advanced. By the 18th century, the populations of Ducal Prussia and Royal Prussia were a mixture of Catholics and Protestants and used both the German and Polish languages. The rest of Poland and most of Lithuania remained overwhelmingly Roman Catholic, while Ukraine and some parts of the Grand Duchy of Lithuania (Belarus) were Greek Orthodox and Greek Catholic (both Church Slavonic liturgy). The society consisted of the upper stratum (8% nobles, 1% clergy), townspeople and the peasant majority. Various nationalities/ethnicities or linguistic groups were present, including Poles, Germans, Jews, Ukrainians, Belarusians, Lithuanians, Armenians and Tatars, among others.

== Native kings; wars with the Ottoman Empire ==
=== Michael Korybut Wiśniowiecki (1669–1673) ===
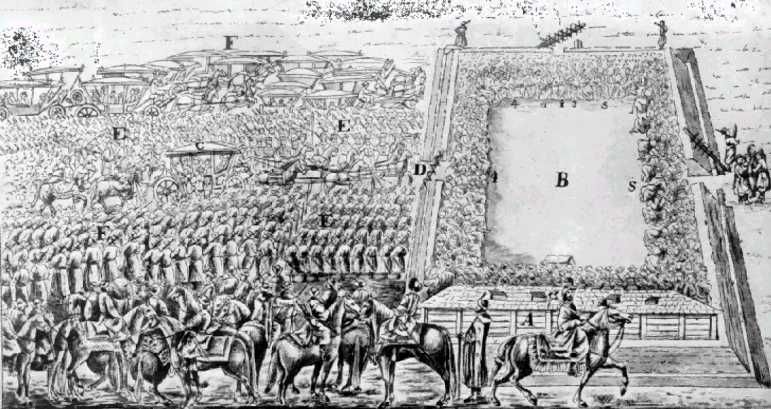
Election of Michał Korybut Wiśniowiecki on Wola fields in 1669

Following the abdication of King John Casimir Vasa and the end of the Deluge, the Polish nobility (szlachta), disappointed with the rule of the Vasa dynasty monarchs, elected Michał Korybut Wiśniowiecki as king, believing that as a non-foreigner he would further the interests of the Polish–Lithuanian Commonwealth. He was the first ruler of Polish origin since the last of Jagiellon dynasty, Sigismund II Augustus, died in 1572. Michael was a son of a controversial but popular with szlachta military commander Jeremi Wiśniowiecki, known for his actions during the Khmelnytsky Uprising.

His reign was not successful. Michael lost a war against the Ottoman Empire, with the Turks occupying Podolia and most of Ukraine from 1672 to 1673. Wiśniowiecki was a passive monarch who readily played into the hands of the Habsburgs. He was unable to cope with his responsibilities and with the different quarreling factions within Poland.

=== John III Sobieski (1674–1696) ===
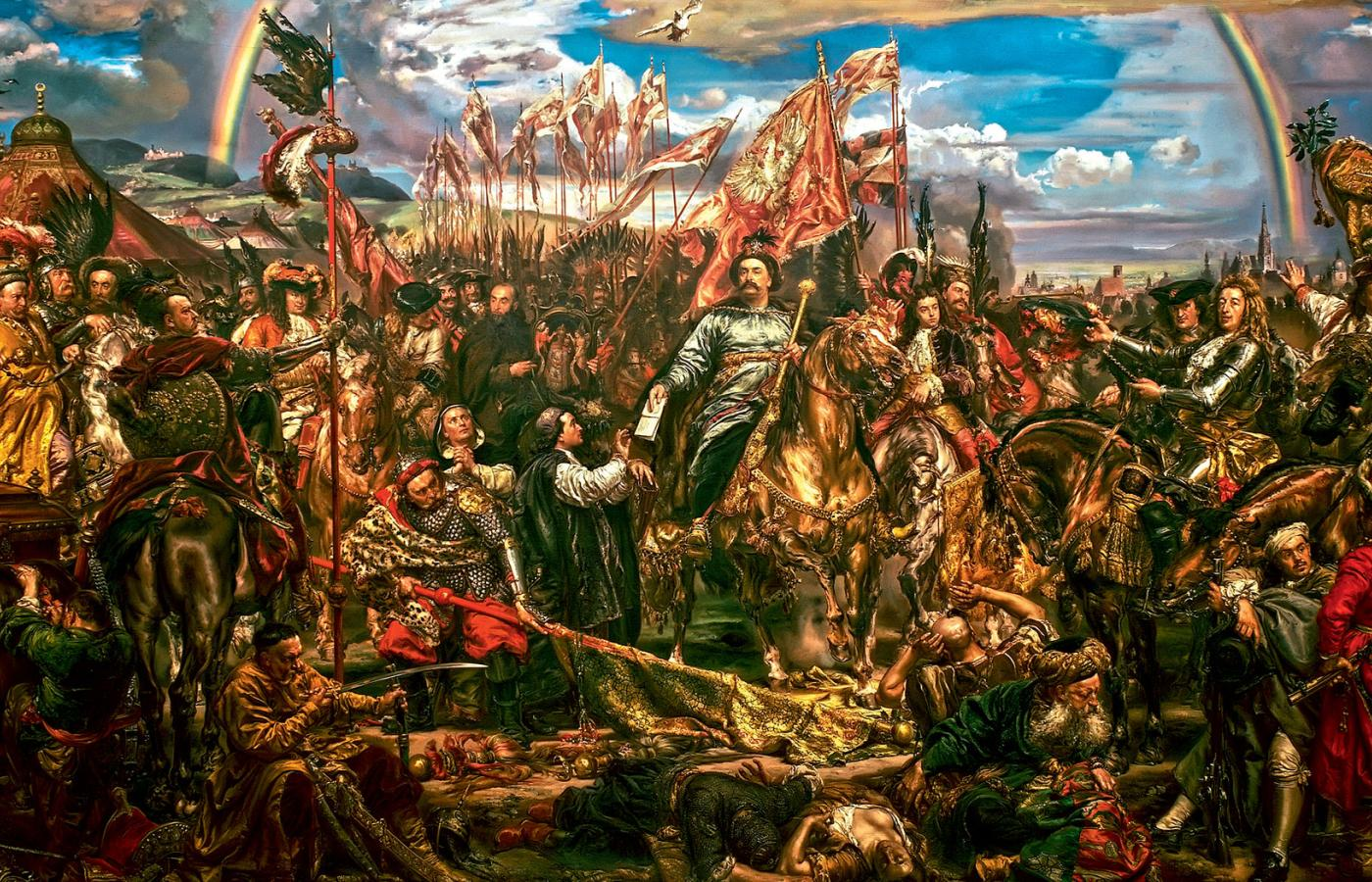
Sobieski Sending Message of Victory to the Pope, after the Battle of Vienna, 12 September 1683

Hetman John Sobieski was the Commonwealth's last great military commander; he was active and effective in the continuing warfare with the Ottoman Empire. Sobieski was elected as another "Piast" (of Polish family) king. John III's most famous achievement was the decisive contribution by the Commonwealth's forces led by him to the defeat of the Ottoman Empire's army in 1683, at the Battle of Vienna.

The Ottomans, if victorious, would have likely become a threat to Western Europe, but the successful battle eliminated that possibility and marked the turning point in a 250-year struggle between the forces of Christian Europe and the Islamic Ottoman Empire. Over the 16 years following the battle (the Great Turkish War), the Turks would be permanently driven south of the Danube River, never to threaten Central Europe again.

For the Commonwealth there was no big payoff for the Turkish victories and the rescuer of Vienna had to cede territories to Russia in return for promised aid against the Crimean Tatars and Turks. Poland had previously formally relinquished all claims to Kiev in 1686. On other fronts John III was even less successful, including agreements with France and Sweden in a failed attempt to regain the Duchy of Prussia. Only when the Holy League concluded peace with the Ottomans in 1699, Poland recovered Podolia and parts of Ukraine.

== Decay of the Commonwealth ==
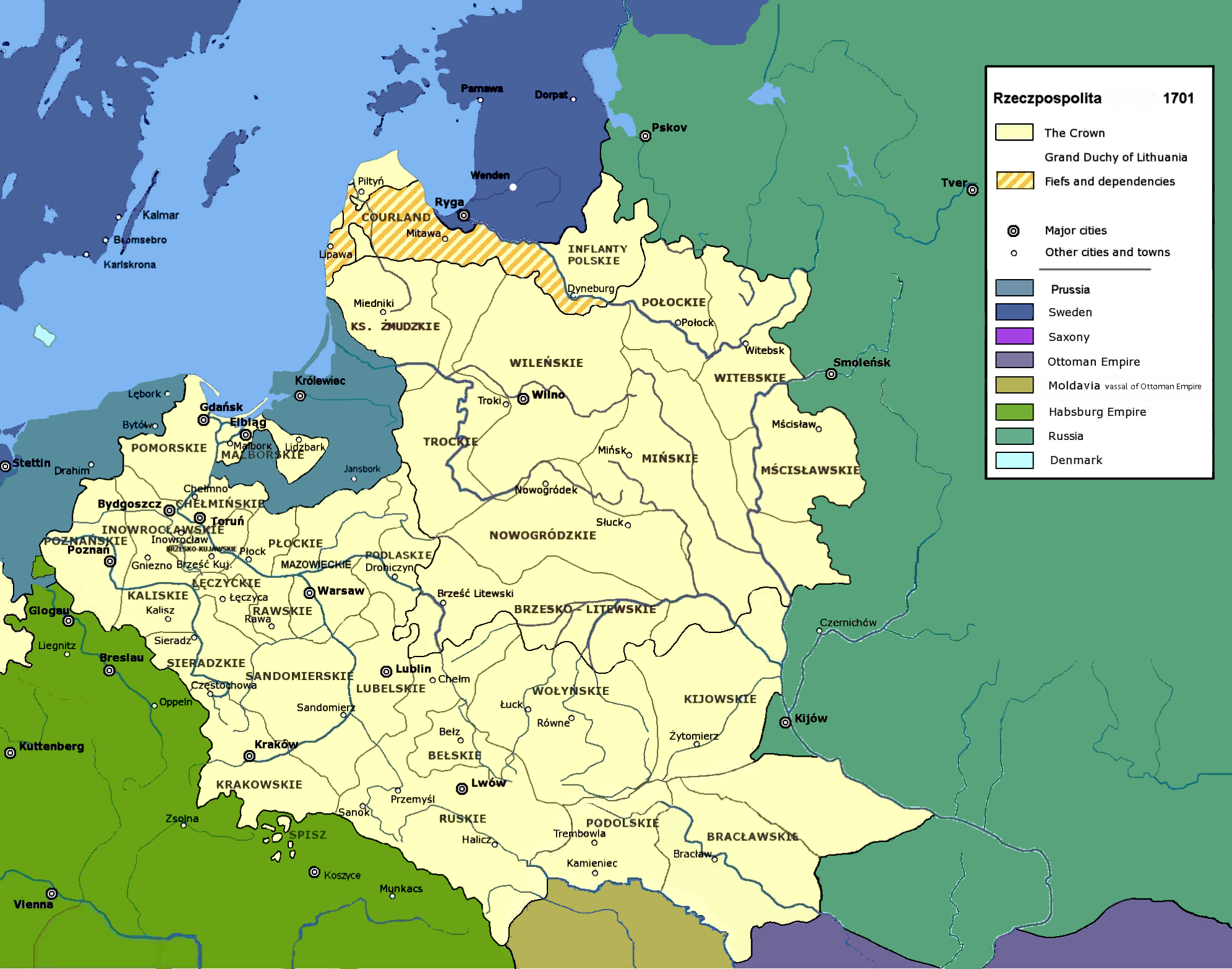
Polish–Lithuanian Commonwealth in 1701

Beginning in the 17th century, because of the deteriorating state of internal politics and government and destructive wars, the nobles' democracy gradually declined into anarchy, making the once powerful Commonwealth vulnerable to foreign interference and intervention. In the late 17th century Poland-Lithuania had virtually ceased to function as a coherent and genuinely independent state.

During the 18th century, the Polish-Lithuanian federation became subject to manipulations by Sweden, Russia, the Kingdom of Prussia, France and Austria. Poland's weakness was exacerbated by an unworkable parliamentary rule which allowed each deputy in sejm to use his vetoing power to stop further parliamentary proceedings for the given session. This greatly weakened the central authority of Poland and paved the way for its destruction.

The decline leading to foreign domination had begun in earnest several decades after the end of the Jagiellon dynasty. Insufficient and ineffective taxation, virulently contested by the szlachta whenever it impinged on their perceived interests, was another contributor to the downfall. There were two kinds of taxes, those levied by the Crown and those levied by legislative assemblies. The Crown raised both customs duties and taxes on land, transportation, salt, lead, and silver. Sejm raised a land tax, a city tax, a tax on alcohol, and a poll tax on Jews. The exports and imports by the nobility were tax-free. The disorganized and increasingly decentralized nature of tax gathering and the numerous exceptions from taxation meant that the king and the state had insufficient revenue to perform military or civilian functions. At one point the king secretly and illegally sold crown jewels.

The nobles or szlachta became increasingly focused on guarding their own "liberties" and blocked any policies designed to strengthen the nation or build a powerful army. Beginning in 1652, the fatal practice of liberum veto was their basic tool. It required unanimity in sejm and permitted even a single deputy not only to block any measure but to cause dissolution of a sejm and submission of all measures already passed to the next sejm. Foreign diplomats, using bribery or persuasion, routinely caused the dissolution of inconvenient sessions of sejm. Of the 37 sejms in 1674–96, only 12 were able to enact any legislation. The others were dissolved by the liberum veto of one person or another.

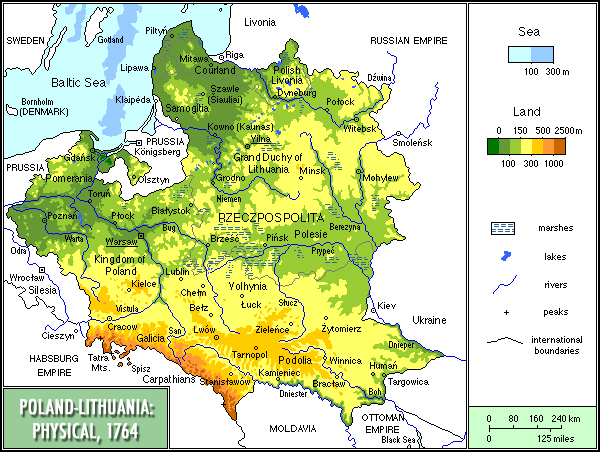
Polish–Lithuanian Commonwealth before the First Partition

The Commonwealth's last martial triumph occurred in 1683 when King John III Sobieski drove the Turks from the gates of Vienna with a heavy cavalry charge. Poland's important role in aiding the European alliance to roll back the Ottoman Empire was rewarded with some territory in Podolia by the Treaty of Karlowitz (1699). This partial success did little to mask the internal weakness and paralysis of the Polish–Lithuanian political system.

For the next quarter century, Poland was often a pawn in Russia's campaigns against other powers. When John III died in 1697, 18 candidates vied for the throne, which ultimately went to Frederick Augustus of Saxony, who then converted to Catholicism. Ruling as Augustus II, his reign presented the opportunity to unite Saxony (an industrialized area) with Poland, a country rich in mineral resources. The King however lacked skill in foreign policy and became entangled in a war with Sweden. His allies, the Russians and the Danes, were repelled by Charles XII of Sweden, beginning the Great Northern War. Charles installed a puppet ruler in Poland and marched on Saxony, compelling Augustus to give up his crown and turning Poland into a base for the Swedish army. Poland was again devastated by the armies of Sweden, Russia, and Saxony. Its major cities were destroyed and a third of the population killed by the war and a plague outbreak in 1702-13. The Swedes finally withdrew from Poland and invaded Ukraine, where they were defeated by the Russians at Poltava. Augustus was able to reclaim his throne with Russian support, but Tsar Peter the Great decided to annex Livonia in 1710. He also suppressed the Cossacks, who had been in revolt against Poland since 1699. Later on, the Tsar frustrated an attempt by Prussia to gain territory from Poland (despite Augustus' approval of this). After the Great Northern War, Poland became an effective protectorate of Russia for the rest of the 18th century. The wide-ranging European War of the Polish Succession, named after the conflict over the succession to Augustus II, was fought from 1733–1735.

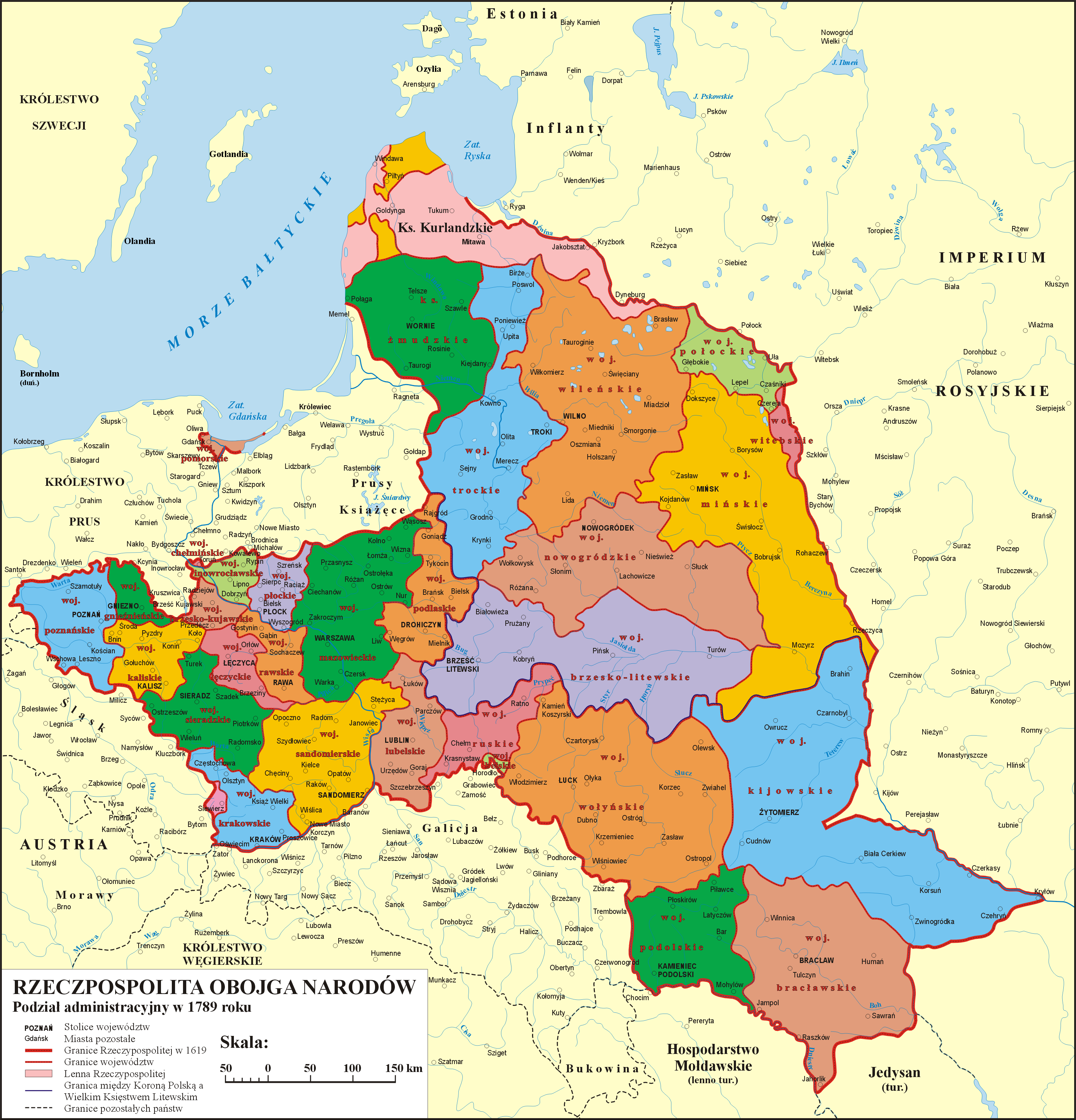
Administrative division of the Polish-Lithuanian Commonwealth in 1789, before the May Constitution and the Second Partition

In the 18th century, the powers of the monarchy and the central administration became mostly formal. Kings were denied opportunity to provide for elementary requirements of defense and finance, and aristocratic clans made treaties directly with foreign sovereigns. Attempts at reform were stymied by the determination of szlachta to preserve their "golden freedoms", most notably the liberum veto. Because of the chaos sown by the veto provision, under Augustus III (1733–63) only one of the thirteen sejm sessions ran to an orderly adjournment.

Unlike Spain and Sweden, great powers that were allowed to settle peacefully into secondary status at the periphery of Europe at the end of their time of glory, Poland endured its decline at the strategic crossroads of the continent. Lacking central leadership and impotent in foreign relations, Poland-Lithuania became a chattel of the ambitious kingdoms that surrounded it, an immense but feeble buffer state. During the reign of Peter the Great (1682–1725), the Commonwealth fell under the dominance of Russia, and by the middle of the 18th century Poland-Lithuania had been made a virtual protectorate of its eastern neighbor, retaining only a theoretical right to self-rule.

By the 18th century, outside commentators routinely ridiculed the ineffectiveness of sejms, blaming the liberum veto. Throughout Europe political commentators unanimously called it a terrible failure. Many Polish nobles regarded the veto as a constructive instrument, to be used as a weapon against the presumably tyrannical aspirations of the monarchy. The long-term result was a weak state that could not compete with its neighbors, especially Prussia and Russia. Inevitably Poland was partitioned among them and the nobles lost all their political rights as well as their nation state.

Several decades before the loss independence, intellectuals began to reconsider the role of the veto and the nature of Polish liberty, arguing that Poland had not been progressing as fast as the rest of Europe because of a lack of political stability. The exposure to Enlightenment ideas gave Poles further reason to reconsider concepts such as society and equality, and this led to discovery of the idea of the naród, or nation; a nation in which all people, not just the nobility, should enjoy the rights of political liberty. The reform movement came too late to save the state, but helped to form the coherent nation, able to survive the long period of Partitioned Poland.

== Commonwealth–Saxony personal union ==
After John III Sobieski's death, the Polish-Lithuanian throne was occupied for seven decades by the German Prince-elector of Saxony, Augustus II the Strong, and his son, Augustus III, of the House of Wettin.

=== Augustus II the Strong (1697–1706, 1709–1733) ===
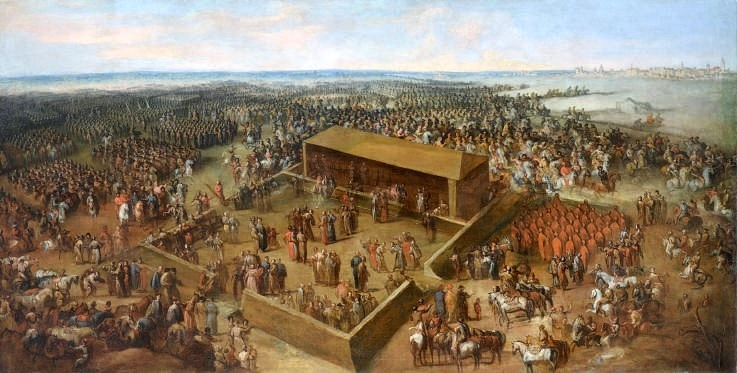
Election of King Augustus II in 1697, painted by Jean-Pierre Norblin de La Gourdaine

Augustus II the Strong, also known as Frederick Augustus I, was an over-ambitious ruler. In the contest for the crown of the Commonwealth he defeated his main rival, François Louis, Prince of Conti, who was supported by France, and King John III's son, Jakub. To ensure his success in becoming the Polish king he converted from Lutheranism to Roman Catholicism. Augustus II virtually bought the election. Augustus hoped to make the Polish throne hereditary for the House of Wettin, and to use his resources as Elector of Saxony to impose some order on the chaotic Polish–Lithuanian Commonwealth. However, he was soon distracted from his internal reform projects and became preoccupied by the possibility of external conquests.

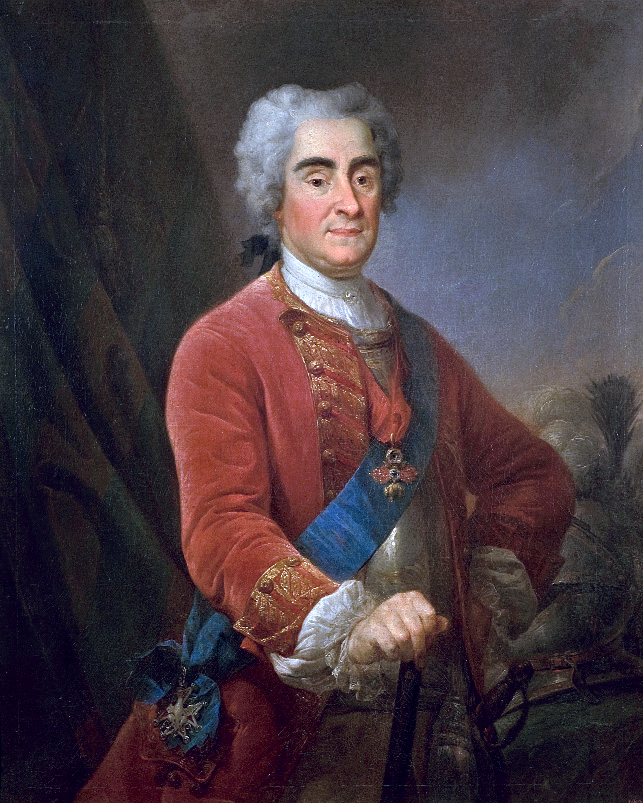
Augustus II the Strong by Marcello Bacciarelli

In alliance with Peter the Great of Russia, Augustus won back Podolia and western Ukraine and concluded the long series of Polish-Turkish wars by the Treaty of Karlowitz (1699). A Cossack revolt that had begun in 1699 was suppressed by the Russians. Augustus tried unsuccessfully to regain the Baltic coast from Charles XII of Sweden. He allied with Denmark and Russia, provoking a war with Sweden. After Augustus' allies were defeated, Sweden's king Charles XII marched from Livonia into Poland, using it then as the base of his operations. Installing a puppet ruler (King Stanisław Leszczyński) in Warsaw, he occupied Saxony and drove Augustus II from the throne. Augustus was forced to cede the crown from 1704 to 1709, but regained it when Tsar Peter defeated Charles XII at the Battle of Poltava (1709). Poland, which after having suffered extensive damages from wars had only recently returned to its 1650 population level, was once again completely razed to the ground by the armies of Sweden, Saxony, and Russia. Two million people died as a result of the war and disease epidemics. Cities were reduced to rubble, and cultural losses were immense. After the Swedish defeat Augustus II regained the throne with Russian backing, but the Russians proceeded to annex Livonia after driving the Swedes from it.

Augustus II was helpless when, in 1701, the Elector of Brandenburg proclaimed himself sovereign "King in Prussia," as Frederick I and founded the aggressive, militaristic Prussian state, which would eventually form nucleus of a united Germany. The victor from Poltava, Tsar Peter the Great declared Russia to be the guardian of the Polish-Lithuanian Republic's territorial integrity. This effectively meant that the Commonwealth became a Russian protectorate; it had remained in this condition for the duration of its existence (until 1795). The policy of Russia was to exercise political control over Poland in cooperation with Austria and Prussia.

=== Stanisław Leszczyński (1706–1709, 1733–1736) ===
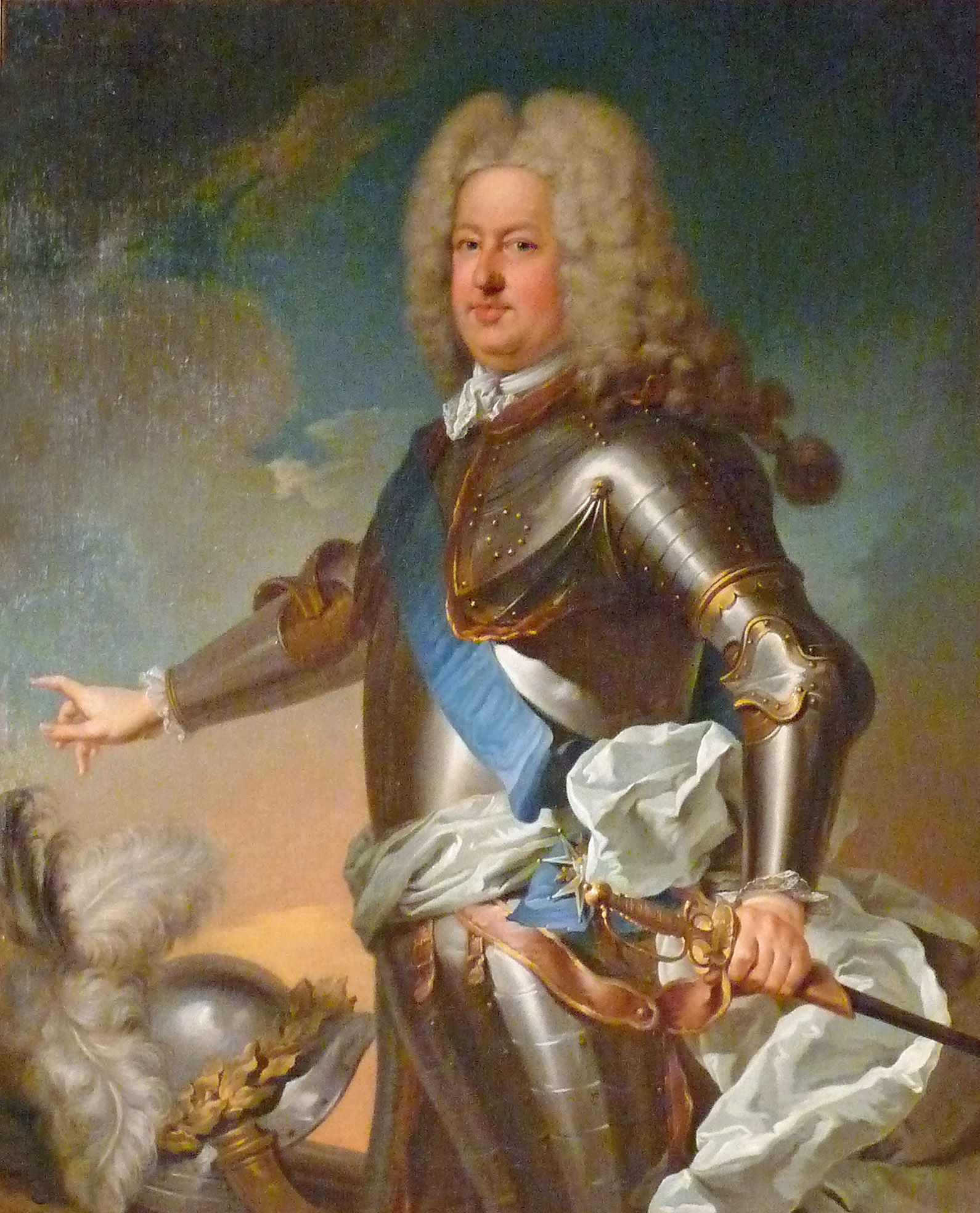
Stanisław Leszczyński

Seen as a puppet of Sweden during his first stint on the throne, Stanisław Leszczyński ruled in times of turmoil, and Augustus II soon recovered the throne, forcing him into exile. He was elected king again following the death of Augustus in 1733, with the support of France and Polish nobles, but not of Poland's neighbors. After the military intervention by Russian and Saxon troops, he was besieged in Danzig (Gdańsk), and again forced to leave the country. For the rest of his life Leszczyński became a successful and popular ruler in the Duchy of Lorraine.

=== August III (1733–1763) ===
Also Elector of Saxony (as Frederick Augustus II), Augustus III inherited Saxony after his father's death, and was elected King of Poland by a minority sejm with the support of Russian troops. Augustus III was a puppet of Russia, and during his reign foreign armies criss-crossed the land. He was uninterested in the affairs of the Polish–Lithuanian Commonwealth, which he viewed mostly as a source of funds and resources for strengthening his power in Saxony. During his 30-year reign, he spent less than 3 years in Poland, delegating most of his powers and responsibilities to Count Heinrich von Brühl. Augustus III's uninvolved reign facilitated political anarchy and further weakened the Commonwealth, while the neighboring Prussia, Austria and especially Russia were becoming increasingly dominant in its affairs.

== Reforms and partitions during the reign of Stanisław August Poniatowski (1764–1795) ==
From the early years of the reign of Empress Catherine the Great (1762–1796), Russia intensified its manipulation of Polish affairs. Prussia and Austria, the other powers surrounding the Republic, also took advantage of internal religious and political bickering. The neighboring states divided up the country in three partition stages. The third one in 1795 wiped Poland-Lithuania from the map of Europe.

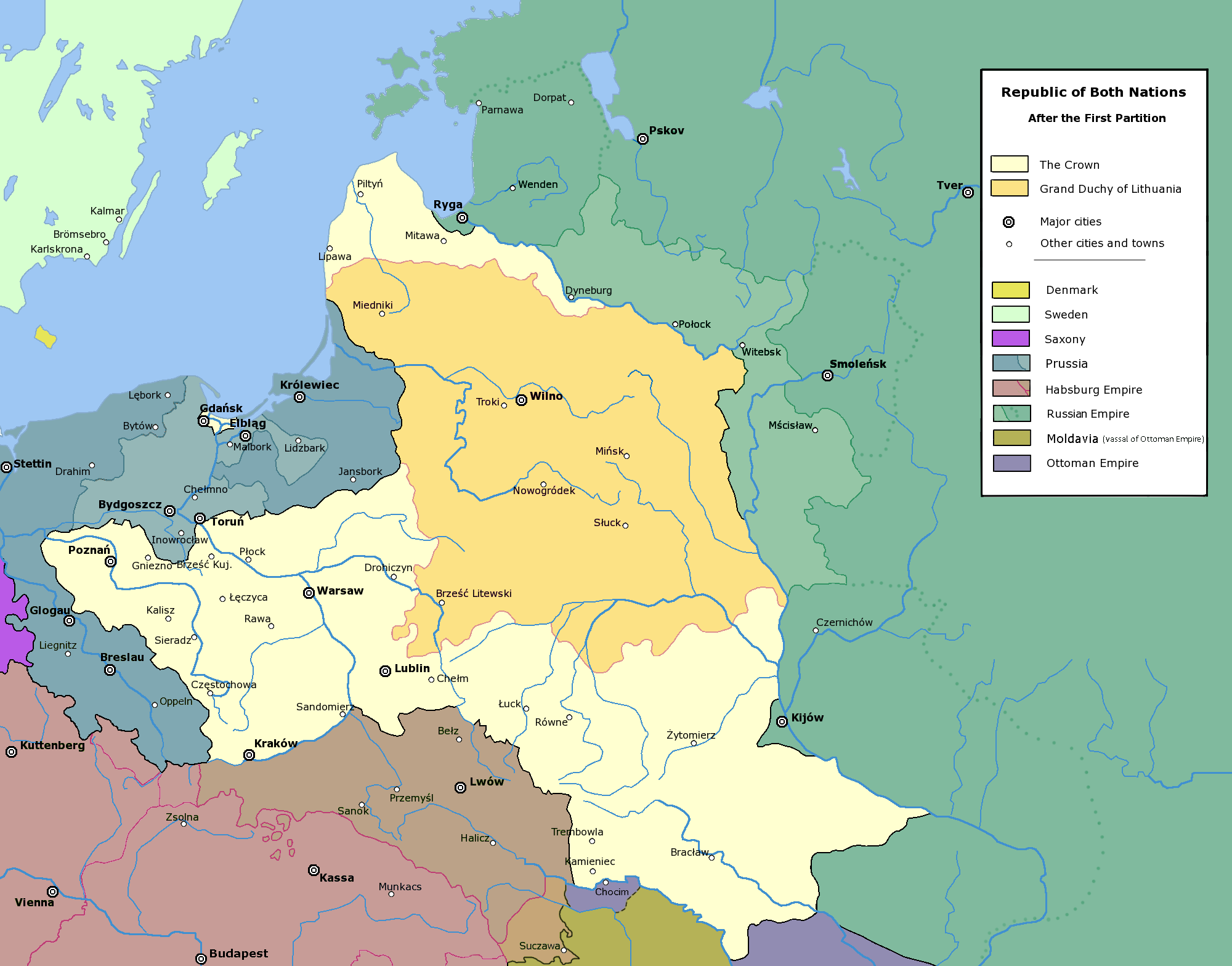
First Partition of Poland (1772)

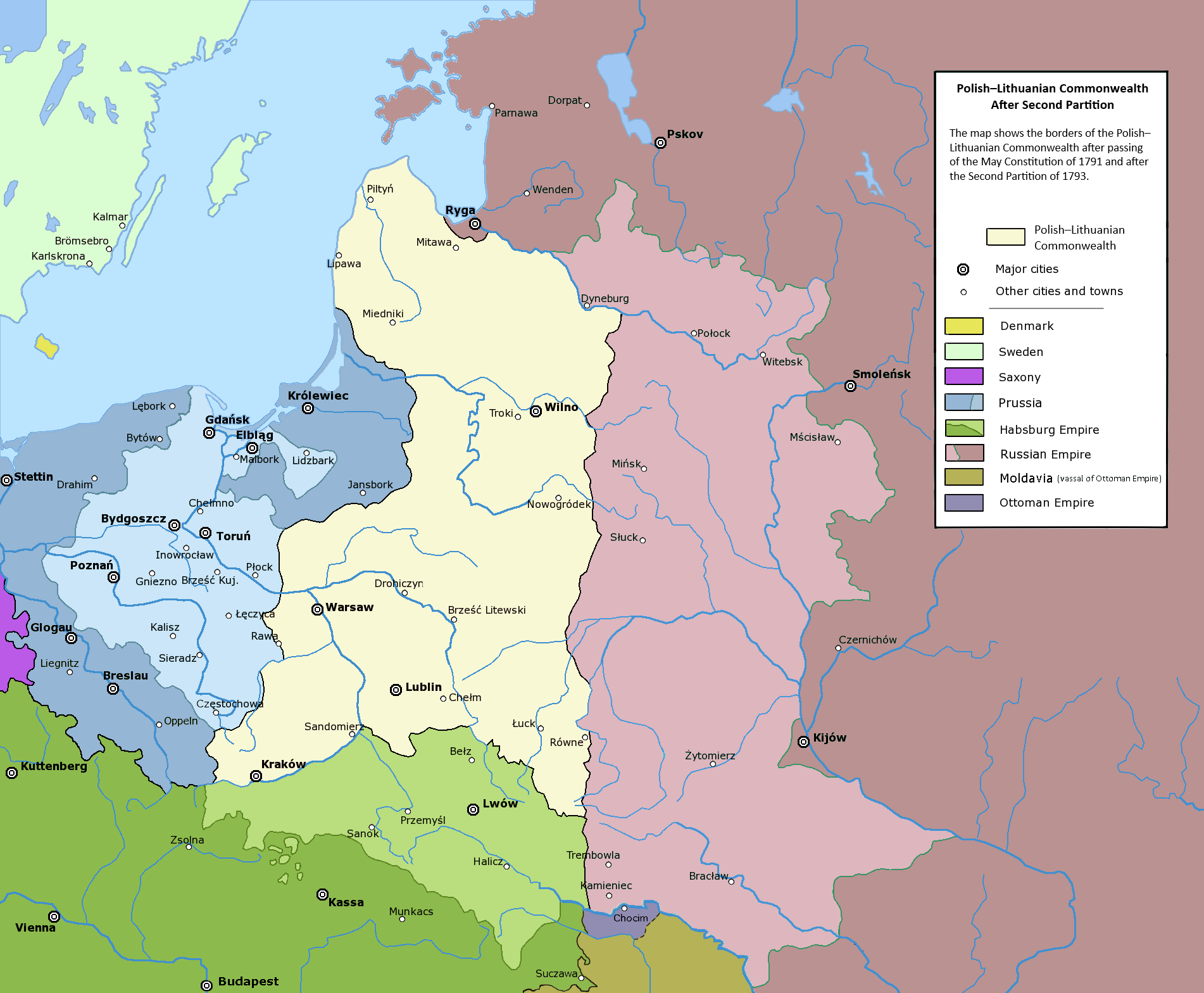
Second Partition of Poland (1793)

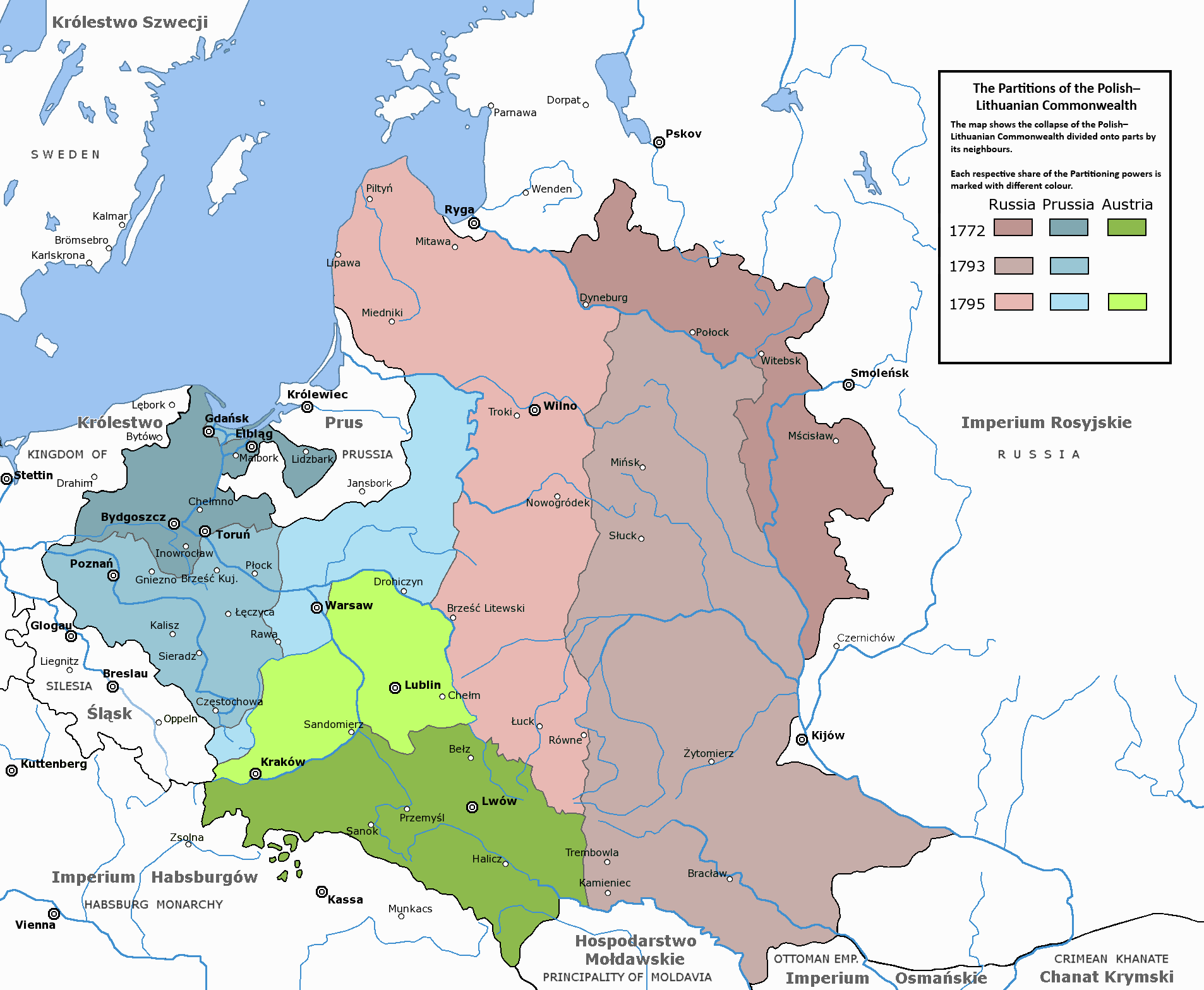
Third Partition of Poland (1795)

=== Russian protectorate and First Partition ===
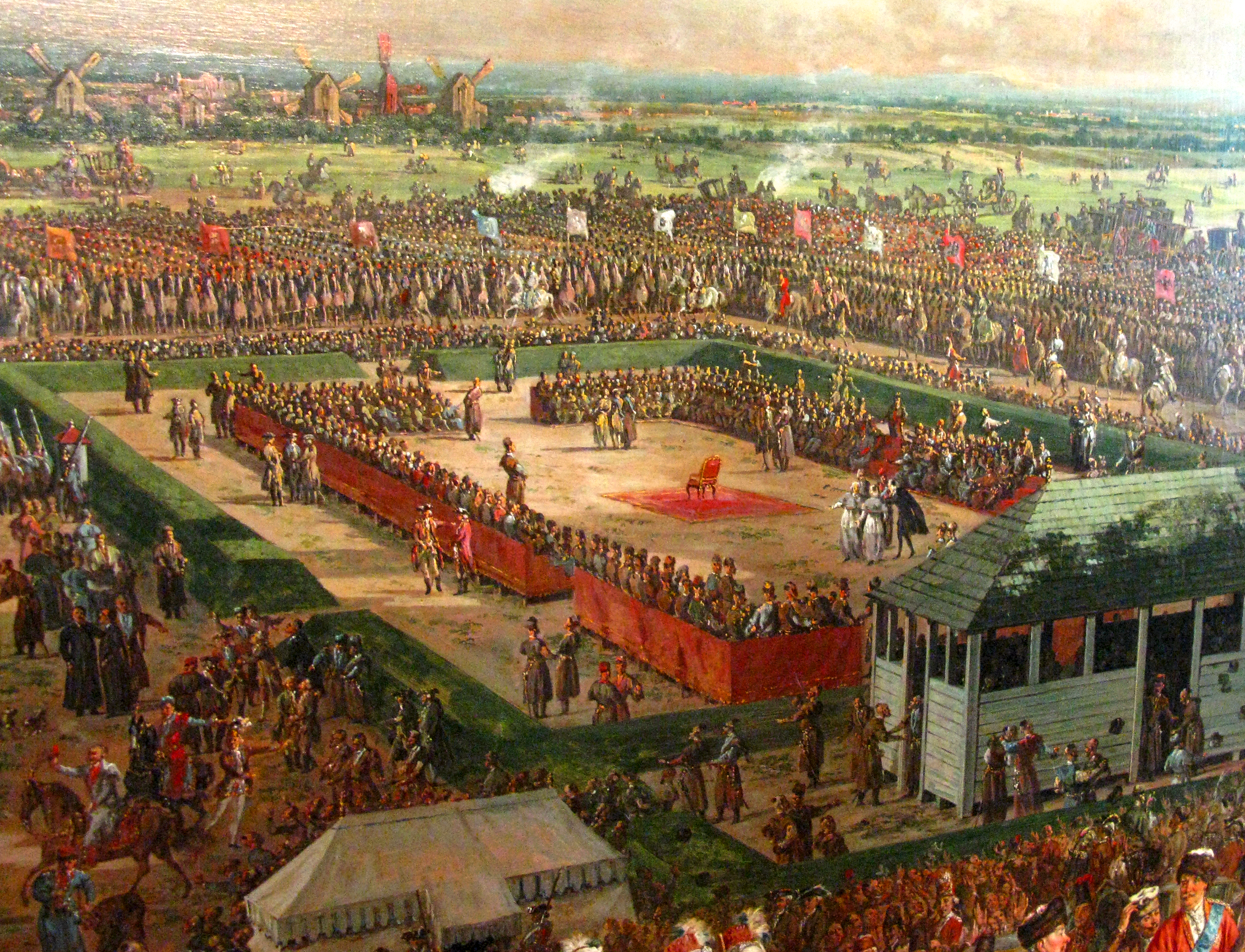
Election of Stanisław August Poniatowski, by Bernardo Bellotto

More enlightened Poles realized by now that reforms were necessary. One faction, led by the Czartoryski family, sought to abolish the fatal liberum veto and promoted a broad reform program; their main rivals were the Potocki family faction. The Czartoryskis entered into collaboration with the Russians, and in 1764 Empress Catherine II of Russia dictated the election of a member of the Czartoryski clan, her former favorite and lover, Stanisław August Poniatowski, as king of the Polish–Lithuanian Commonwealth. Partially confounding expectations that he would be an obedient servant of his former mistress, Stanislaw August encouraged a modernization of his realm's dysfunctional political system and achieved a temporary moratorium on use of the liberum veto in sejm (1764–1766). This threatened to increase the strength of central government and brought displeasure in the foreign capitals that preferred an inert, pliable Poland. Displeased Catherine encouraged religious dissension in Poland-Lithuania's substantial Eastern Orthodox population, which had lost the rights guaranteed to them in the 16th century.

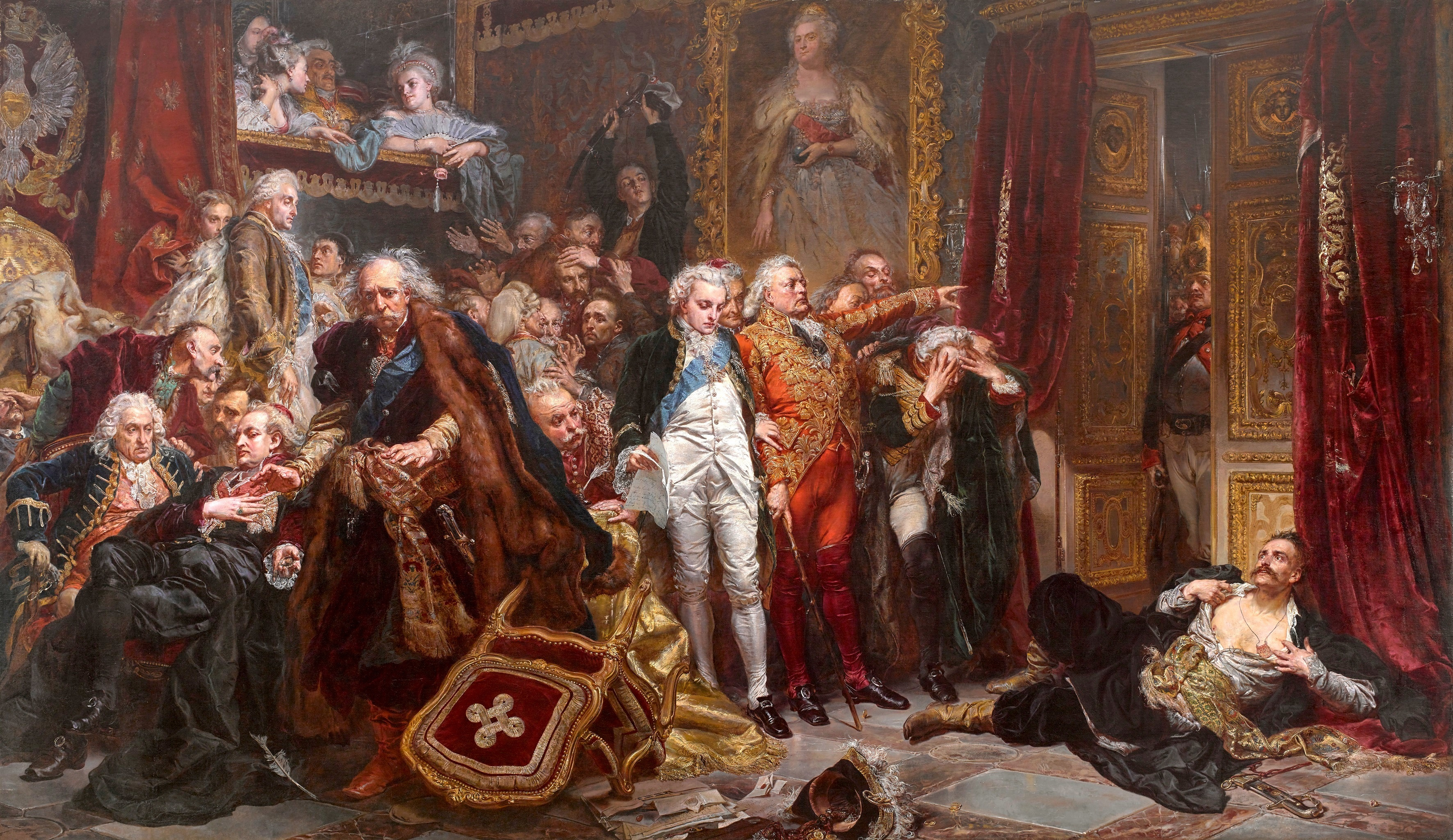
Rejtan - The Fall of Poland. In September 1773 Tadeusz Rejtan dramatically tried to prevent the legalization of the First Partition of Poland in the Polish Sejm.

Under heavy Russian pressure, the unhappy sejm introduced religious toleration and Orthodox and Protestant equality with Catholics in 1767. Through the Polish nobles that Russia controlled (the Confederation of Radom) and Russian Minister to Warsaw Prince Nicholas Repnin, Catherine forced a sejm constitution (comprehensive legislation), which undid Poniatowski's reforms of 1764. The liberum veto and other old abuses of szlachta power were guaranteed as unalterable parts of this new constitution. Poland was however also compelled to sign a treaty of guarantee with Russia, where Catherine was imposed as protector (guarantor) of the Polish political system. The system could not be changed without Russia's approval, and thus the Commonwealth became de facto a Russian protectorate. The real power in Poland lay with the Russian ambassadors, and the Polish king became to a significant degree an executor of their will.

This situation provoked in 1768 a Catholic uprising and civil war known as the Confederation of Bar. The Confederation was a league of Polish nobles that fought against the King and Russian forces until 1772, to revoke the Empress' mandate. The Confederation's warfare and defeat provoked in part a partition of the Commonwealth (seizure of its outer territories) by its neighbors. Although Catherine initially opposed partition, King Frederick II of Prussia, interested in territorial gains and in neutralizing Austria's threatening military position, promoted a partition scheme that would be favorable to the interests of all three partitioning states. Emperor Joseph II of the Habsburg monarchy and then Empress Catherine agreed, and in 1772 Russia, Prussia, and Austria forced the terms of partition upon the helpless Commonwealth, under the pretext of quelling anarchy and restoring order.

=== National revival ===
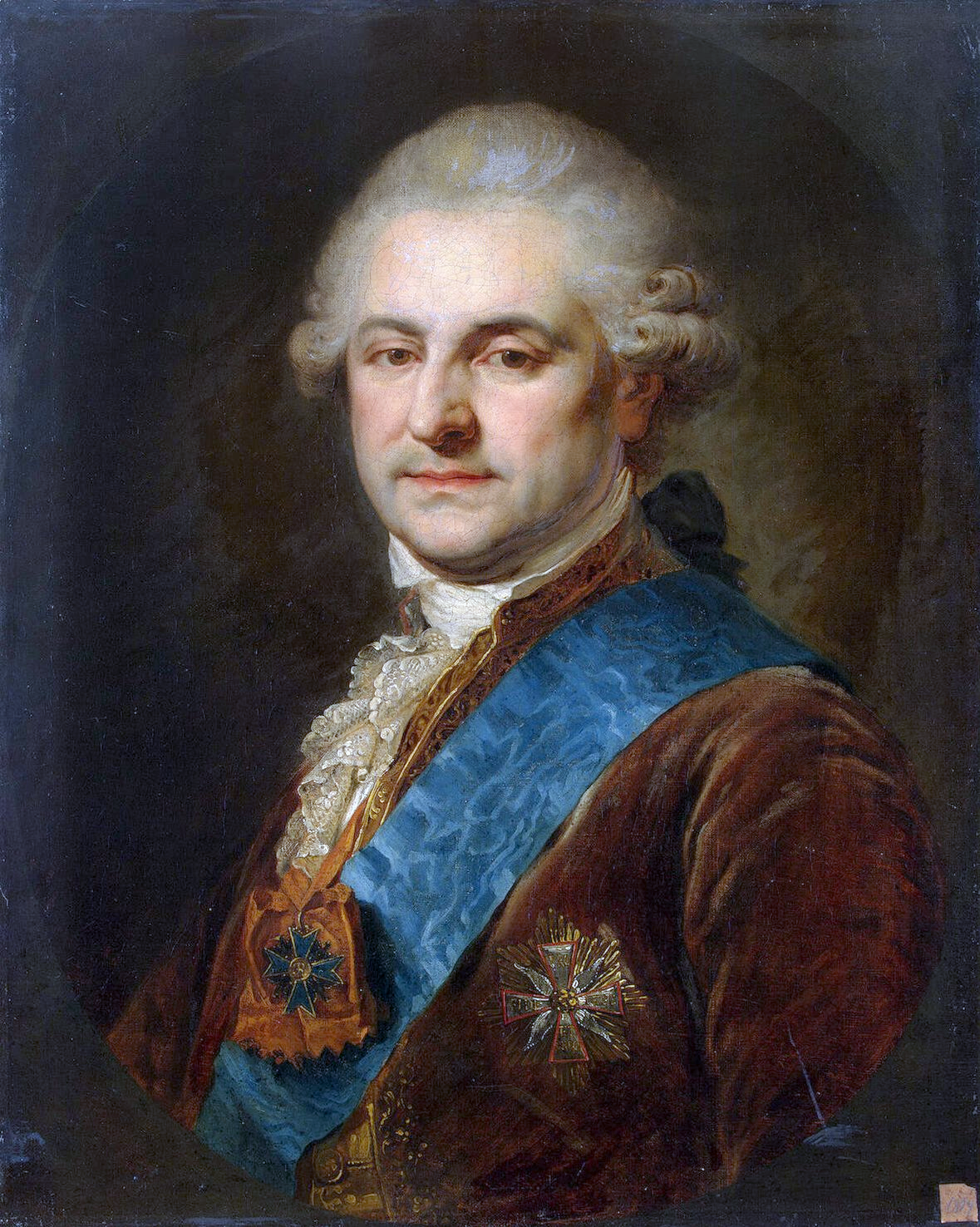
Stanisław August Poniatowski, the last king of the Polish-Lithuanian Commonwealth. Portrait by Johann Baptist von Lampi the Elder.

The first partition in 1772 did not directly threaten the stability of the Polish-Lithuanian state. Poland still retained extensive territory that included the Polish heartlands. Moreover, the shock of the annexations made clear the dangers of decay in government institutions, creating a body of opinion favorable to reform along the lines of the European Enlightenment. King Stanisław August supported the progressive elements in the government and promoted the ideas of foreign political figures such as Edmund Burke and George Washington.

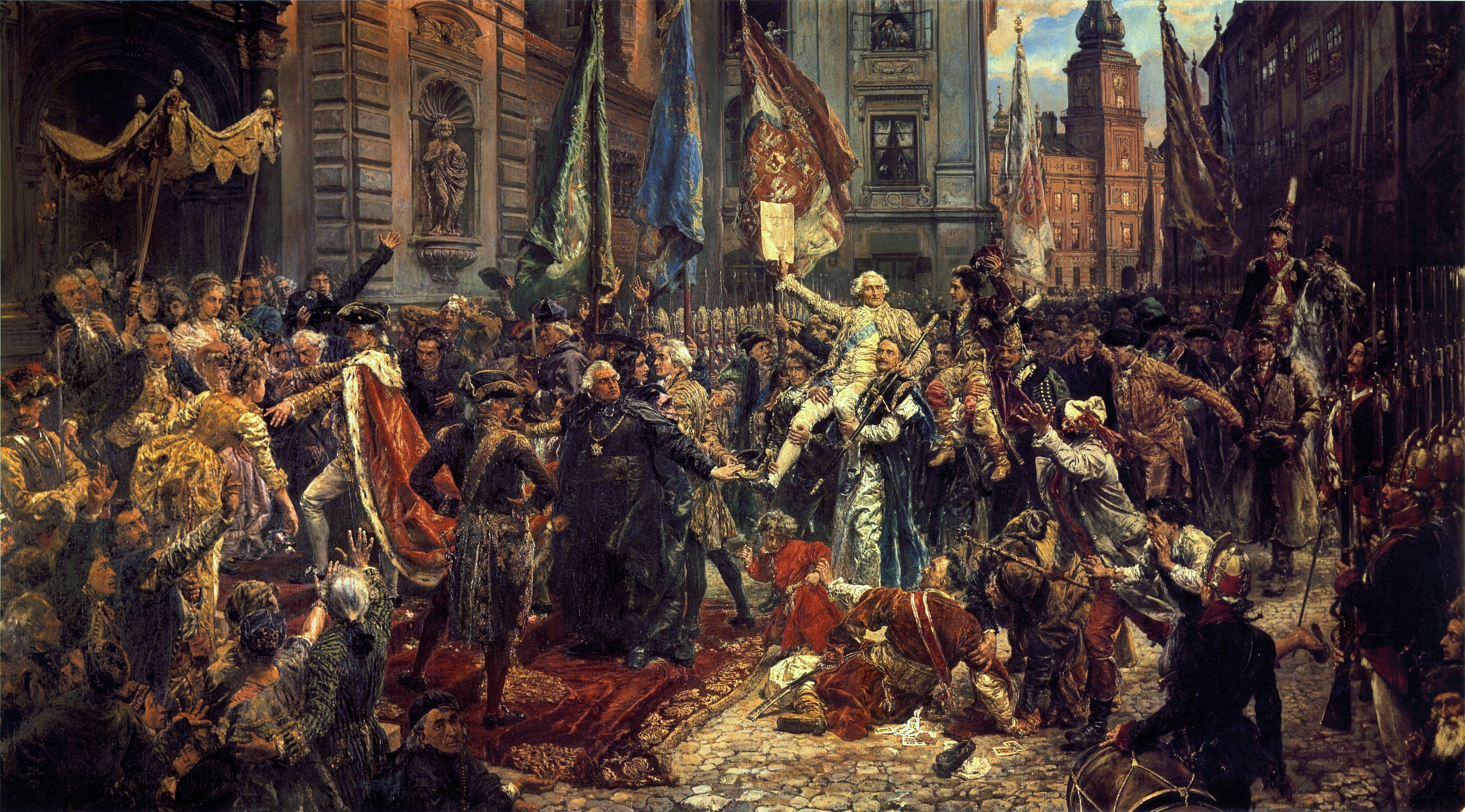
Constitution of May 3, 1791 has just been adopted. Jan Matejko crowded onto this painting numerous personalities of the reform era.

Polish intellectuals studied and discussed Enlightenment philosophers such as Montesquieu and Rousseau. During the period of Enlightenment in Poland, the concept of democratic institutions for all classes was accepted in the more progressive circles of Polish society. Education reform included the establishment of the first ministry of education in Europe (the Commission of National Education). Taxation and the army underwent thorough reform, and central executive government was established as the Permanent Council. Landholders emancipated large numbers of peasants, although there was no official government decree. Polish cities and business enterprises, in decline for many decades, were revived by the influence of the Industrial Revolution, especially in mining and textiles.

Stanisław August's process of renovation reached its climax when, after three years of intense debate, the "Great Sejm" produced the Constitution of May 3, 1791, which historian Norman Davies called "the first constitution of its kind in Europe". Conceived in the liberal spirit of the contemporaneous document in the United States, the constitution recast Poland-Lithuania as a hereditary monarchy and got rid of many of the eccentricities and antiquated features of the old system of government. The new constitution abolished the individual veto in parliament; provided a separation of powers among the legislative, executive, and judicial branches of government; and established "people's sovereignty" (for the noble and bourgeois classes). Although never fully implemented, the Constitution of May 3 gained a cherished position in the Polish political heritage; tradition marks the anniversary of its passage as the country's most important civic holiday.

=== Destruction of Poland-Lithuania ===
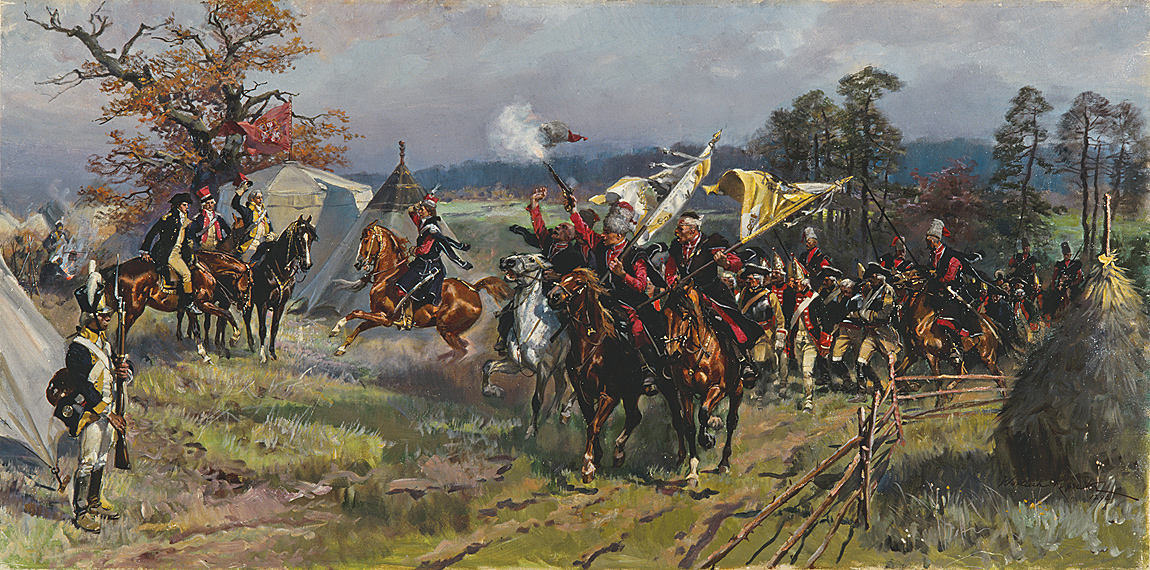
After the Battle of Zieleńce, fought during the Polish–Russian War of 1792. By Wojciech Kossak.

Passage of the constitution alarmed many nobles, some of whom would lose considerable stature under the new order. In autocratic states such as Russia, the democratic ideals of the new constitution also threatened the existing order, and the prospect of Polish recovery threatened to end domination of Polish affairs by Poland's neighbors. In 1792, Polish conservative factions formed the Confederation of Targowica and appealed for Russian assistance in restoring the status quo. Empress Catherine was happy to use this opportunity; enlisting Prussian support, she invaded Poland under the pretext of defending Poland's ancient liberties. A defensive war against powerful Russian armies was fought in 1792 with some measure of success, but the irresolute Stanislaw August, who did not believe in the possibility of defeating the Russian Empire, capitulated, defecting to the Targowica Confederation. Arguing that Poland had fallen prey to radical Jacobinism, then at high tide in France, Russia and Prussia abrogated the Constitution of May 3, carried out the Second Partition of Poland in 1793, and placed the remainder of the country under occupation by Russian troops.

The Second Partition was far more injurious than the first. Russia received a vast area of eastern Poland, extending southward nearly to the Black Sea. To the west, Prussia received an area that became known as South Prussia, nearly twice the size of its First Partition gains along the Baltic, as well as the port of Danzig (Gdańsk). Poland's neighbors thus reduced the Commonwealth to a rump state and signaled their intention to abolish it altogether at their convenience.

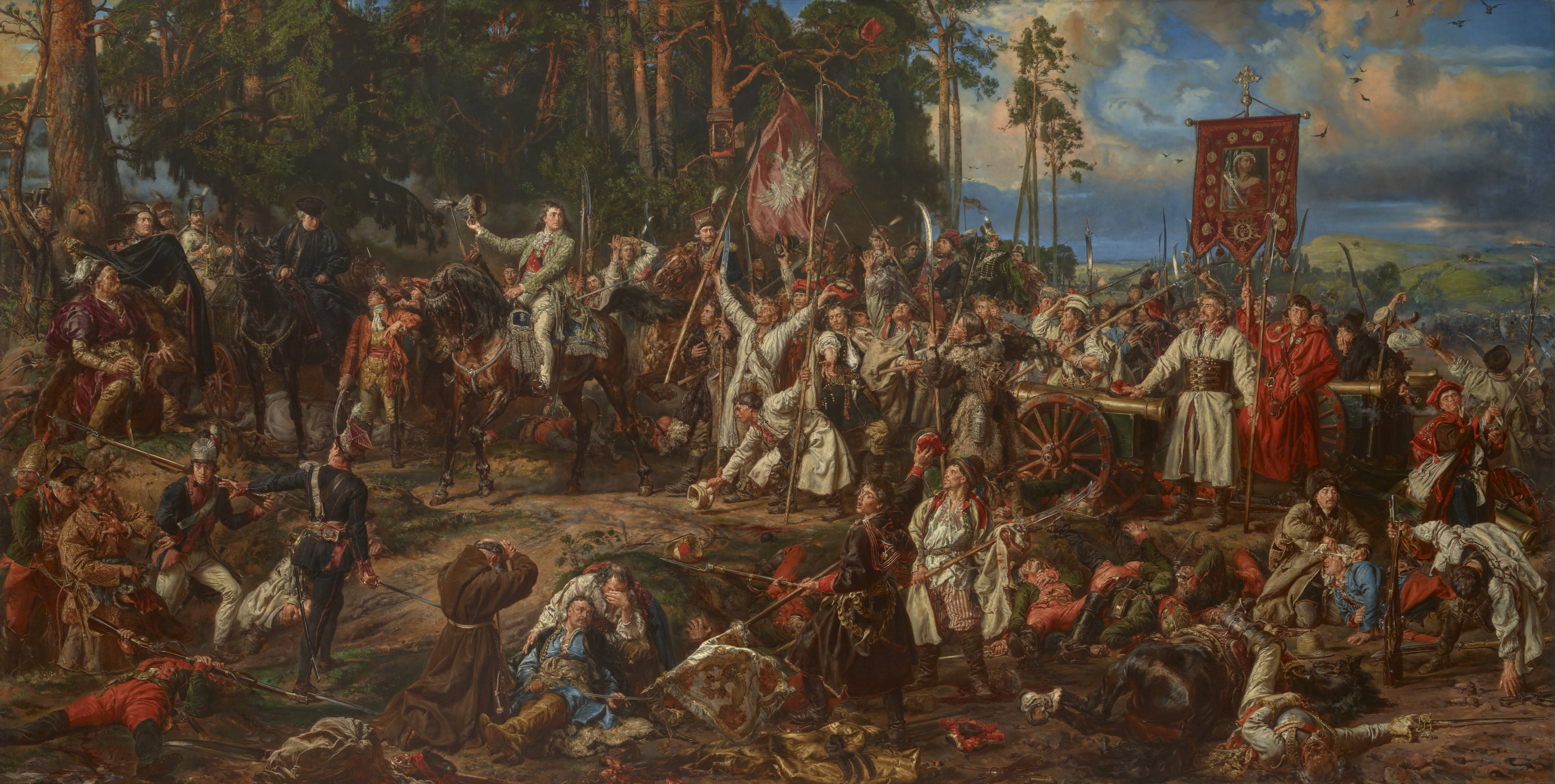
Battle of Racławice, 4 April 1794, during the Kościuszko Uprising, the final military attempt to preserve the Polish-Lithuanian state

The Kościuszko Uprising, a great Polish revolt, broke out in 1794 under the leadership of Tadeusz Kościuszko, a military officer who had rendered notable service in the American Revolution. Kościuszko's ragtag insurgent armies won some initial successes, but they eventually fell before the superior forces of Russian General Alexander Suvorov. In the wake of the insurrection of 1794, Russia, Prussia, and Austria carried out the third and final partition of Poland-Lithuania in 1795, erasing the Commonwealth of Two Nations from the map and pledging to never allow its return.

Much of Europe condemned the dismemberment as an international crime without historical parallel. Amid the distractions of the French Revolution and its attendant wars however, no state actively opposed the final annexations. In the long term, the dissolution of Poland-Lithuania upset the traditional European balance of power, dramatically magnifying the influence of Russia and paving the way for the powerful Germany that would emerge in the nineteenth century with Prussia at its core. For the Poles, the Third Partition began a period of continuous foreign rule that would endure for well over a century.

== See also ==
- History of the Polish–Lithuanian Commonwealth (1569–1648)
- History of the Polish–Lithuanian Commonwealth (1648–1764)
- History of the Polish–Lithuanian Commonwealth (1764–1795)
- List of Polish monarchs
- List of Polish nobles
- Ambassadors and envoys from Russia to Poland (1763–1794)
