= Karabutove =

Village in Sumy Oblast, Ukraine

Karabutove Карабутове
- Village
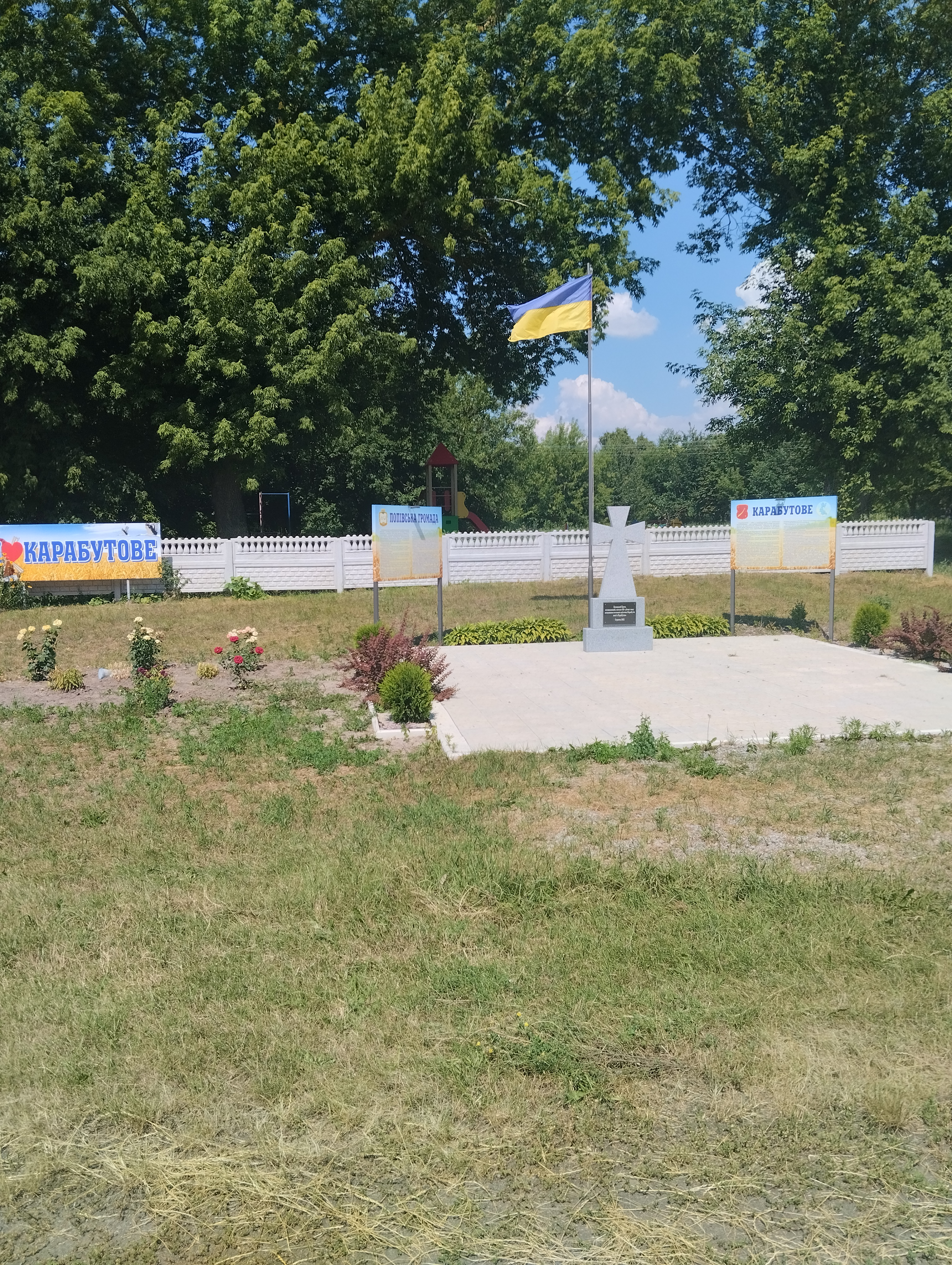

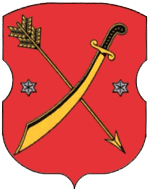
- Coat of arms

- Location of Karabutove in Sumy Oblast Location of Karabutove in Ukraine
- Coordinates: 51°04′12″N 33°21′26″E
- Country: Ukraine
- Oblast: Sumy Oblast
- Raion: Konotop Raion
- Hromada: Popivka rural hromada
- First mentioned: 1572

Population
  - Total: 505

Karabutove (formerly Korybutiv) is a village in Sumy Oblast, Ukraine. As of 2001, the population was 505 people. It is located on the right bank of the Romen river at its confluence with the Torgovytsia River, 28 kilometres (17 mi) from the district center. The first mention of the village dates back to 1572.

== Streets ==
- Shevchenko str.
- Bohdana Khmelnytskyi str.
- Sadova street
- Sviderskoho st.
- Berehova st.
- Klyuchyn str.

== Notable people ==
- Oleksandr Sviderskyi, Hero of the Soviet Union.

== Etymology of the name of the village ==
Professor of Kyiv State University K. Tyshchenko interprets the origin of the name of the village either from the name of Prince Koribut, or from Lithuanian language:

The name of the village Karabutov is perceived now as Tatar-Lithuanian: kara "black" + but from Lit. bùtas "dwelling". It is possible that this name, which was clearer in its time, may actually come from the unattested *Koributov - formed from the Lithuanian proper name Koribut: during the time of Vytautas, a prince with this name ruled in Novgorod-Siverskyi in 1388-1392 - or from Lithuanian words kéroti "to grow" + bùtas "dwelling"

== History ==
In 1991, the population of the village supported the Act of Restoration of State Independence of Ukraine. However, as a result of the Russian occupation, the demographic base of the village and its social structure were significantly undermined.

The following activities are carried out on the territory of the village council: the Karabutiv village council, the agricultural enterprise STOV "Batkivshchyna", a paramedic-midwifery center, a comprehensive school of the 1st-3rd grades, a village club, a library, private shops.

== Sources ==
- Костянтин Тищенко. Про географічні назви Конотопщини
- Погода в селі
- Карабутове, село, Конотопський район, Сумська область
