= Cossack uprisings =

Series of military conflicts, 1591–1775

The Cossack uprisings (also kozak rebellions, revolts) were a series of military conflicts between the Cossacks and the states claiming dominion over the territories they lived in, namely the Polish–Lithuanian Commonwealth and Russian Empire during the 16th, 17th, and 18th centuries. The conflict resulted from both states' attempts to exert control over the independent-minded Cossacks. While the early uprisings were against the Commonwealth, as the Russian Empire gained increasing and then total control over the Ruthenian (Ukrainian) lands where most of Cossacks lived, the target of Cossack uprisings changed as well.

== History ==
The origins of the first Cossacks are disputed. Traditional historiography dates the emergence of Cossacks to the 14th to 15th centuries. Towards the end of the 15th century, the Ukrainian Cossacks formed the Zaporozhian Sich centered on the fortified Dnipro islands. Initially a vassal of Polish–Lithuanian Commonwealth, the increasing social and religious pressure from the Commonwealth sparked a series of uprisings, and the proclamation of an independent Cossack Hetmanate, culminating in a rebellion under Bohdan Khmelnytsky in the mid-17th century. While the Cossacks were useful to the Polish-Lithuanian states in the war periods, they proved to be more problematic in the peacetime, due to their raids on the Commonwealth neighbours (primarily, the Ottoman Empire and its allies). Further, the Polish nobility tried to assert control over the Cossack territories, turn them into feudal latifundia, limit the growth of the militant Cossacks, and even reverse it, by turning the Cossacks into serfs. Afterward the Khmelnytsky Uprising, the Treaty of Pereyaslav brought most of the Cossack Hetmanate under Russian control.

The Zaporozhian Cossacks were not the only notable group of Cossacks; others included the Don Cossack Host, Sloboda Cossacks, Terek Cossacks and Yaik Cossacks. As the Tsardom of Muscovy took over the disputed Cossack lands from Poland–Lithuania, all Cossacks eventually came under Russian rule, but the Tsarist and later Imperial government had only a limited degree of control over them. The Cossacks provided refuge for runaway serfs and bandits, and often mounted unauthorized raids and pirate expeditions against the Ottoman Empire. While the Cossack hosts in the Russian Empire served as buffer zones on its borders, the expansionist ambitions of the empire relied on ensuring control over the Cossacks, which caused tension with their traditional independent lifestyle. As the empire attempted to limit Cossack autonomy in the 17th and 18th centuries, this resulted in rebellions, such as those led by Stenka Razin, Kondraty Bulavin and Yemelyan Pugachev. In extreme cases, whole Hosts could be dissolved, as was the fate of the Zaporozhian Sich in 1775. In this last phase of their history, the Cossacks lost most of their autonomy to the Russian state.

Cossack uprisings, like the Cossack people themselves, have been portrayed variously in the Polish, Russian and Ukrainian historiographers.

== List of uprisings ==
- Kosiński uprising (1591–1593)
- Nalyvaiko Uprising (1594–1596)
- Uprising of Bolotnikov (1606–1607)
- Zhmaylo uprising (1625)
- Fedorovych uprising (1630)
- Sulima Uprising (1635)
- Pavlyuk uprising (1637)
- Ostryanyn uprising (1638)
- Cossack riots (1648)
- Khmelnytsky Uprising (1648–1654)
- Barabash Uprising (1658)
- Left-Bank Uprising (1668-1669)
- Razin Uprising (1667–1671)
- Paliy uprising (1702–1704)
- Bulavin Rebellion (1707–1708)
- 1734 Haidamak Uprising (1734)
- 1750 Haidamak Uprising (1750)
- Koliivshchyna (1768–1769)
- Pugachev's Rebellion (1774–75)
- Kyiv Cossacks insurrection (1855)

== Bibliography ==
- Kotarski, Henryk (1979). Polski Słownik Biograficzny, t. XXIV (in Polish). Wrocław.
- Serdczyk, Władysław (1984). Na dalekiej Ukrainie: Dzieje Kozaczyzny do 1648 roku [In distant Ukraine: The history of the Cossacks until 1648] (in Polish). Kraków: Wydawnictwo Literackie. ISBN 83-08-01214-0.
- Słownik geograficzny Królestwa Polskiego i innych krajów słowiańskich, Tom XII, XIII (in Polish). Wrocław: Bilblioteka Uniwersytecka w Warszawie. 1892.
