= Aleksander Koniecpolski =

Aleksander Koniecpolski may refer to:

- Aleksander Koniecpolski (1555–1609), voivode (palatine) of Sieradz and the father of Stanisław Koniecpolski
- Aleksander Koniecpolski (1620–1659), Polish nobleman and the son of Stanisław Koniecpolski
- Jan Aleksander Koniecpolski (?-1719), colonel and member of the Koniecpolski family
