= Remigiusz Koniecpolski =

Remigiusz Koniecpolski (died 1640) was a Polish noble and bishop of Chełm (1627–1640).

== Biography ==
He was likely born in Koniecpol, where the manor of the Koniecpolski magnate family was located. He was the son of Aleksander Koniecpolski, and a brother of the famous military commander (hetman), Stanisław Koniecpolski.

He became a priest. As the abbot of the Cistercian monastery in Jędrzejów he began the process of canonization of blessed Wincenty Kadłubek. Reputed to be an efficient administrator, gathering funds for both the Church and the local municipalities, he was elevated to the position of bishop of Chełm on 17 May 1627. From that point onward, as the position of a bishop granted him a rank in the Senate of Poland, he became involved in the Polish–Lithuanian Commonwealth country-wide matters, and his diocese was administered by one of his assistants, Jan Sasin. He also held the royal court position of the Royal Secretary.

He died in October 1640.
