= Sulyma uprising =

Cossack rebellion

- Part of Cossack uprisings
Date	1635
Location	Ukraine
Result	Polish-Lithuanian victory

Belligerents
Polish–Lithuanian Commonwealth	Cossacks

Commanders and leaders
Stanisław Koniecpolski; Jean Marion (executed)	Ivan Sulyma (executed)

The Sulyma uprising (Polish: Powstanie Sulimy, Ukrainian: Повстання Сулими, Povstannia Sulymy) was a Cossack rebellion headed by Ivan Sulyma (Iwan Sulima) against the Polish–Lithuanian Commonwealth in 1635. The rebels succeeded in capturing and destroying the newly built Kodak Fortress, but were defeated by Polish forces under Hetman Stanisław Koniecpolski soon afterwards. Sulyma was executed in December of the same year.

== Background ==
The Polish–Lithuanian Commonwealth controlled most of the Cossack territories at the time, and their nobility was trying to turn militant Cossacks into serfs. The Cossacks were also responsible for provoking some conflicts with the Ottoman Empire. To secure the troublesome south-eastern border, the Commonwealth began construction of a new fortress, the Kodak fortress, finished in July 1635.

== Uprising ==
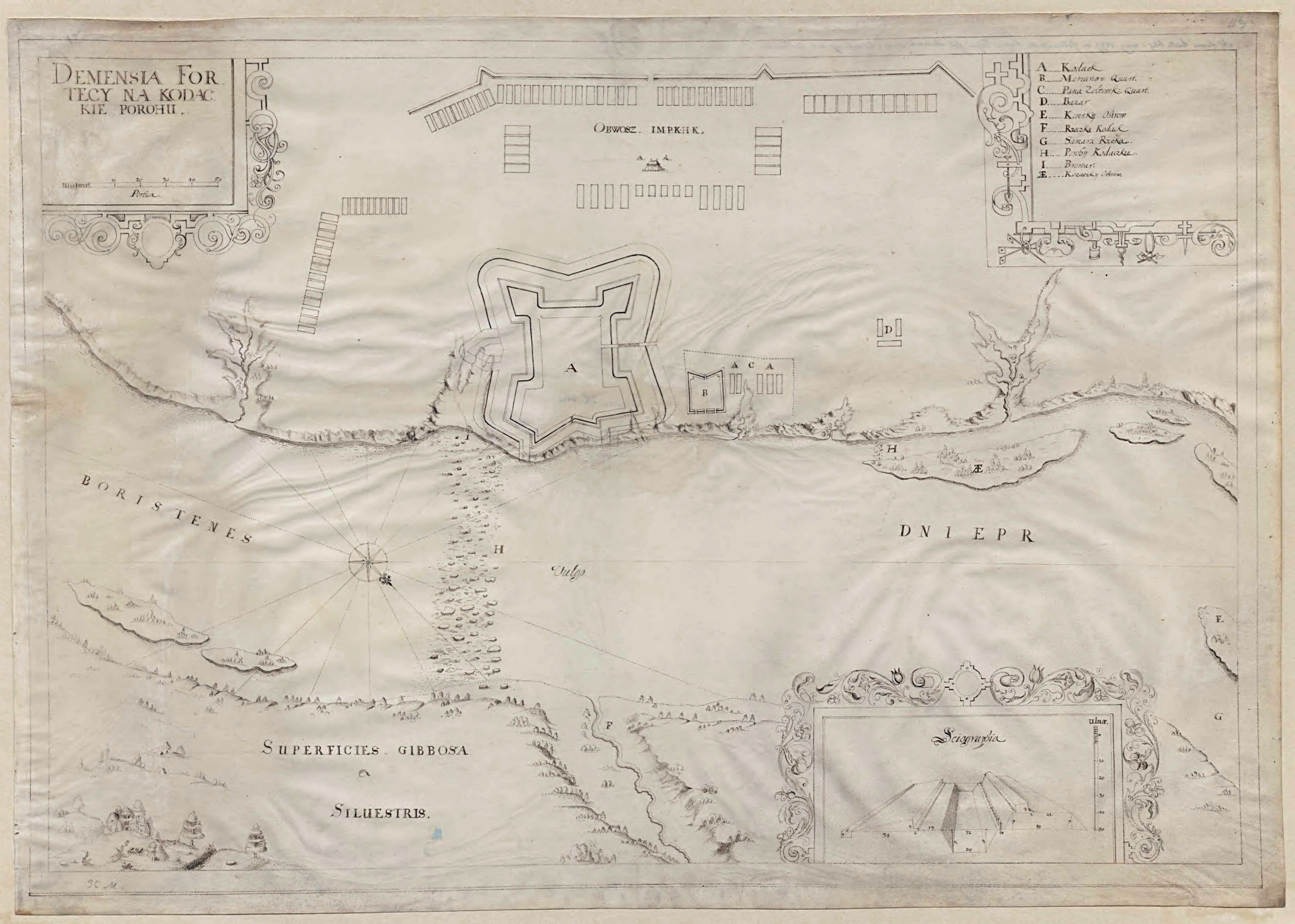
Map of the Kodak fortress (1635)

Soon after the Kodak fortress was finished, after returning from a raid in the Black Sea against the Ottomans, Cossack leader Ivan Sulyma decided to rebel against the Commonwealth. He took advantage of the fact that Polish commander, hetman Stanisław Koniecpolski, and much of the Army of the Polish–Lithuanian Commonwealth, was away at the Polish-Swedish negotiations (for the Treaty of Stuhmsdorf). On the night of 3 to 4 August or 11 to 12 August 1635 (sources vary) he took the newly constructed Kodak fortress by surprise and subterfuge, burning it and killing most of its crew of about 200 dragoon mercenaries under colonel Jean Marion. Marion, taken prisoner, was tied to a stake and shot with arrows. Subsequently Sulyma's forces attacked several other Polish outposts in the region, such as at Cherkasy and Korsun.

Soon afterwards, however, his forces were defeated by the army of hetman Stanisław Koniecpolski at Ostrów Dnieprowski. Koniecpolski was also aided by the loyal registered Cossacks. (According to other sources, there was no significant battle, and the Cossacks surrendered as soon as sizeable Polish forces entered Ukraine). During subsequent negotiations, Sulyma was turned over to the Commonwealth by Cossack elders or starshina (Illyash Karayimovych and Ivan Barabas). Together with five other leaders of his rebellion, Hetman Sulyma was taken to Warsaw, in time for his case to be debated by the second Sejm of 1635. Hetman Koniecpolski promised him he would not be executed, and at first, the Polish King Władysław IV Waza, known for his friendly attitude towards the Cossacks, was also hesitant to execute Sulyma, especially since he was a person upon whom the Pope himself bestowed his medal. However, pressured by the nobility who wanted to show that no rebellions against the 'established order' would be tolerated, and the Ottoman envoy, the order for an execution was given; after being tortured, Sulyma was cut to pieces and his body parts were hung on the city walls of Warsaw on 12 December 1635. Four other Cossack leaders were also executed; the only one who was pardoned, due to a request from chancellor Tomasz Zamoyski, was Pavel Mikhnovych.

The revolt is primarily noted for the surprise capture and complete destruction of the newly built Kodak Fortress (Polish: Forteca Kudak), a symbol of Polish suppression of Cossack autonomy.

While Sulyma and his son were executed in Warsaw, Polish authorities also purged the Cossack Register, removing suspected sympathizers and tightening control over who was granted the privileges and pay of a registered Cossack.
