= Taras Fedorovych =

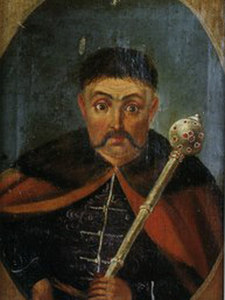
Taras Triasylo

Taras Fedorovych (pseudonym, Taras Triasylo, Hassan Tarasa, Assan Trasso) (Ukrainian: Тара́с Федоро́вич, Polish: Taras Fedorowicz) (died after 1636) was a prominent leader of the Dnieper Cossacks, a popular Hetman (Cossack leader) elected by unregistered Cossacks.

Between 1629 and 1636, Fedorovych played a key role in the regional conflicts involving the rebellion of the Ruthenian (Ukrainian) Cossacks and peasants against the Polish rule over the Dnieper Ukraine territory as well as in the conflicts that included the Polish–Lithuanian Commonwealth, the Tsardom of Russia and the Ukrainians torn between those two neighbors.

With many circumstances of his life remaining mysterious to this day, Fedorovych is a revered figure in both Ukrainian folklore and in the Ukrainian national idea, a hero of poems by Taras Shevchenko, a personage of the earliest Ukrainian motion picture and one of only four Cossack leaders explicitly mentioned in the Pavlo Chubynsky poem that later became the basis of the modern National Anthem of Ukraine.Cimmerians

== Early life ==
Taras Fedorovych was born to a Tatar family in Crimea, his given name was Hassan. It is unclear when he converted to Eastern Orthodox Christianity and joined the Zaporozhian Cossacks Host. He is initially documented by references in the 1620s to his position as the Cossack Polkovnyk (Colonel) Hassan Tarasa in Hungarian chronicles, noted for considerable cruelty during his participation in the Thirty Years War as a Habsburg mercenary. In 1629, after the pro-Polish Cossack Hetman Mykhailo Doroshenko was killed in Crimea, the unregistered Cossacks elected Fedorovych to the Hetmanship and, under his leadership, participated in the subsequent Crimean campaign.

== Fedorovych uprising ==
=== Hostilities ===
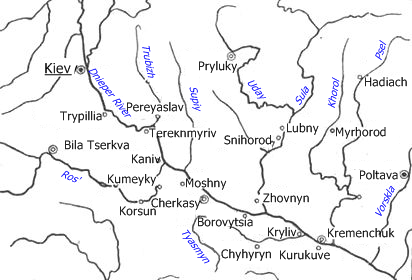
The area up in arms during the Fedorovych Uprising.

In March 1630, Fedorovych became the leader of a Cossack and peasant revolt, which became known as the Fedorovych Uprising carried out by the unregistered Cossacks dissatisfied with the conditions of the 1625 Treaty of Kurukove (also known as the Treaty of Lake Kurukove) signed earlier by Doroshenko, which restricted the number of the registry to only six thousand. In the meantime, the real numbers of Cossacks swelled by the constant flow of runaway peasants and, especially, at the end of the Polish-Swedish War (1625–1629), by the addition of a huge number of demobilized Ukrainians who refused to accept a return under Polish serfdom. The ranks of Cossacks who joined the resistance reached forty thousand.

The Cossack uprising fell on the fertile ground of the overall condition of Ukrainian peasantry who under Polish control were subject to continued enserfment and exploitation by mostly Polish or polonized szlachta (nobility). Particularly resented was the attempt to impose Roman Catholicism on the unwilling Ukrainians, who had been traditionally Eastern Orthodox.

About ten thousand rebels proceeded from the Zaporizhian Sich towards the upper Dnieper territories, overrunning the Polish forces stationed there. The rebels captured and executed the Hetman of the registered Cossacks Hryhoriy Chorny for his pro-Polish stance and support of the Union of Brest, and subsequently came to an agreement on a new leadership by nominating Fedorovych for the position of Hetman.

Fedorovych addressed the Ukrainian commoners with several Universals calling upon everyone to join his uprising against the Polish "usurpers". The turbulence spread over the nearby territories, with many Cossacks and peasants rising against the local Polish nobles as well as wealthy Jewish merchants who, despite their limited involvement in the local power structure were also hated by the peasants as Polish land owners frequently gave to the Jews the role of arendators (see tax farming) in the local taxation system. As religious services such as baptism, wedding ceremonies and funerals conducted in the Eastern Orthodox tradition customary for Ruthenians, were now to be taxed, with most of the commoners and especially the Cossacks being fiercely Orthodox, the Jews were perceived by many Ruthenians as a part of the oppressor/exploiter group.

As clashes increased, casualties rose on both sides. After a victory at Korsun over the Polish army sent against them, the rebel Cossacks controlled a large territory that included Korsun, Pereiaslav, Kaniv as well as other cities, with Pereiaslav becoming their main base.

In response to their successes, a large Polish army led by Stanisław Koniecpolski was sent to confront the Cossacks. The army, strengthened by German mercenary forces, was harassed by the rebels, and, in turn, plundered and massacred Lysianka, Dymer and several other Ukrainian settlements, then crossed the Dnieper where they were met by the rebels, both front and rear, as more Ukrainians rose in what became an area-wide rebellion against the Poles. The indecisive skirmishes around Pereiaslav lasted three weeks until the 25 May [O.S. 15 May] 1630. Koniecpolski laid siege to the Cossack stronghold, but lacking the support of artillery and infantry, he could not break its walls; the Cossacks, however, were lacking supplies and agreed to negotiations. Though the Polish army was not defeated, its inability to defeat the rebellious Cossacks meant that the latter gained an upper hand in the negotiations; Ukrainian historiography calls the battle at Pereiaslav a victory, but this is disputed by Polish historiography.

=== Negotiations ===
Fedorovych's military successes forced Koniecpolski to start negotiations with the Cossack leadership, which resulted in the 1630 Treaty of Pereiaslav. Many of the demands of the non-registered Cossacks and Fedorovych, their leader, were discarded in the treaty negotiations by other Cossack leaders. The main demand voiced by Fedorovych and his supporters—that the Cossack privileges routinely guaranteed to the limited number of registered Cossacks should be granted to all runaway peasants who claimed Cossackdom—was rejected and, according to a narrow compromise, the Cossack register was enlarged from six to eight thousand. In return, Koniecpolski demanded that Fedorovych be delivered into Polish custody.

Fedorovych, uncertain of the decision that would be reached, over his head, by the "compromising" faction of Cossack leadership, left Pereiaslav along with other Cossacks dissatisfied with the agreement and headed for the Cossack stronghold of the Zaporizhian Sich. Meanwhile, the Cossack leadership faction inclined to a compromise with Poland, elected Timofiy Orendarenko whose Hetmanship was confirmed with Koniecpolski's agreement. Fedorovych, disgruntled with this turn of events, tried to raise the Cossack masses to start a new uprising, but the energy for such an undertaking was no longer forthcoming.

== The last years of life ==
Fedorovych fought on the Moscow side in the Smolensk War against Poland (1632–34). In the winter of 1634-35 he yet again tried to convince the Cossacks to turn against the Poles at the Kaniv Council, but received only very limited support.

In 1635 he negotiated with the Russians the resettlement of 700 Cossacks in Russian-leaning Sloboda territories and, in 1636, suggested the creation of a pro-Russian Cossack regiment. His proposal was rejected by the Russians who did not want to endanger their new relationship with Poland after the recently concluded Treaty of Polyanovka.

The Cossack chronicles state that Fedorovich died nine years after the uprising, therefore in 1639. There are legends that he died in Korsun, where he was buried in the Bohulavsky cemetery.

== Legacy and place in history ==
Documentation of most of the details of Taras Fedorovych's life has been lost in time, including the year and circumstances of his death. There is no specific record of his activities before the mid- to late-1620s, and after 1636. The brief period, however, in which he played one of the leading roles in the region's history, established his name as an ancient and lasting source of inspiration to future generations of Ukrainians.

Taras Shevchenko wrote a heroic poem, Taras Night, around Triasylo's character.

Fedorovych is one of four Ukrainian hetmans mentioned in the original version (published in 1863) of Pavlo Chubynsky's poem "Shche ne vmerla Ukraina" ("Ukraine Has Not Perished") which was later transformed into the Ukrainian national anthem. A quatrain of the poem reads: "Nalyvaiko, Zalizniak / And Taras Triasylo / Call us from beyond the grave / To the holy battle".

In 1926, a feature film, Taras Triasylo, directed by Pyotr Chardynin, was released by the All-Ukrainian Kino Foto Direction (BUFKU). It recounted the then nearly three-hundred-year-old events through the silent-movie prism of the Soviet film industry.

Taras Tryasila Street exists in Kyiv
