= Treaty of Pereyaslav (disambiguation) =

- Pereiaslav Agreement, the 1654 Cossack Rada convened in Pereyaslav on the initiative of Bohdan Khmelnytsky to address the issue on mutual relations between Cossack Hetmanate and Muscovy
- Treaty of Pereiaslav (1630), between rebellious Cossack forces of Taras Fedorovych and Polish forces led by hetman Stanisław Koniecpolski
- Pereiaslav Articles, a 1659 treaty between Yuri Khmelnytsky, the son of Bohdan Khmelnytsky, and the Russian tsar, drastically limiting the Ukrainian (Cossack) autonomy
