= Stanisław Koniecpolski (died 1682) =

Polish noble

- Coat of arms: Pobóg
- Born: after 1643
- Died: 1682
- Noble family: Koniecpolski
- Consort: Eugenia Katarzyna Wiśniowiecka
- Father: Aleksander Koniecpolski
- Mother: Joanna Barbara Zamoyska

Stanisław Koniecpolski (born after 1643, died 1682) was a Polish nobleman (szlachcic).

Stanisław became Camp Leader of the Crown in 1676, voivode of Podole Voivodeship in 1679, castellan of Kraków in 1682 and starost of Belz.

Stanisław Koniecpolski was married to Eugenia Katarzyna Wiśniowiecka. He died childless.
