= Stanisław Koniecpolski =

Polish military commander (1591–1646)

Hetman Stanisław Koniecpolski
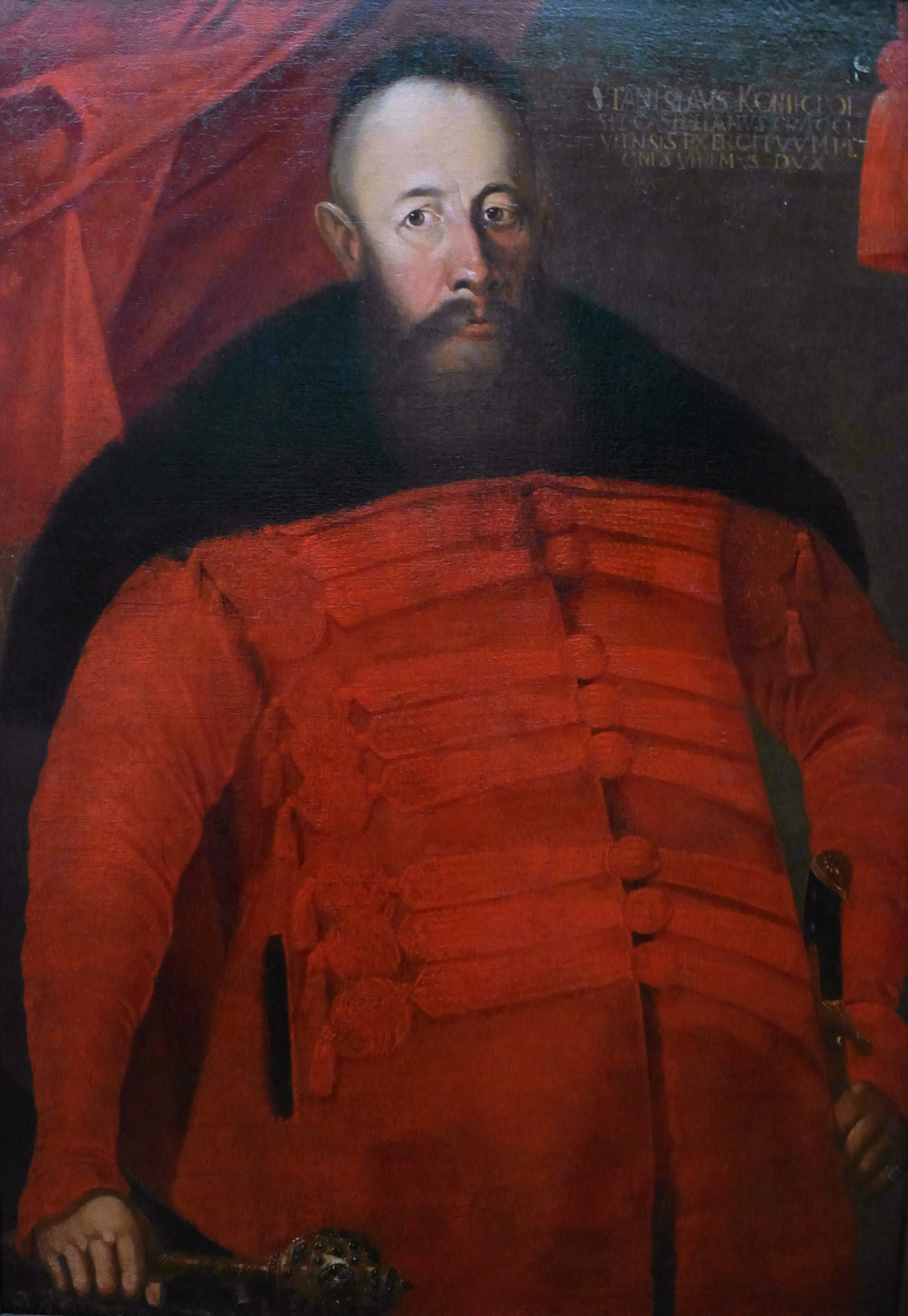
- Stanisław Koniecpolski, by an anonymous painter, 17th century

- Coat of arms: Pobóg
- Born: 1590/1594^{[a]} unknown
- Died: 11 March 1646 (aged 52–56); Brody, Polish–Lithuanian Commonwealth
- Noble family: Koniecpolski
- Spouses: Katarzyna Żółkiewska (1615); Krystyna Lubomirska (1619); Zofia Opalińska (1646)
- Issue: Aleksander Koniecpolski
- Father: Aleksander Koniecpolski
- Mother: Anna Sroczycka
- Military career
- Allegiance: Poland–Lithuania
- Branch: Military of the Polish–Lithuanian Commonwealth
- Conflicts: Treelike list: Crimean–Nogai slave raids in Eastern Europe; Battle of Orynin; Battle of Martynów; Battle of Ochmatów (1644); Polish–Ottoman War (1620–1621); Battle of Cecora (1620); Polish–Swedish War (1626–1629); Battle of Czarne; Battle of Dirschau; Battle of Trzciana; Polish–Ottoman War (1633–1634); Battle of Paniowce; Cossack uprising; Zhmaylo uprising; Battle of Kurukov Lake (1625); Fedorovych uprising; Battle of Pereiaslav; Sulyma uprising

Stanisław Koniecpolski (Polish pronunciation: [staˈɲiswaf kɔɲɛt͡sˈpɔlskʲi]; 1591 – 11 March 1646) was a Polish military commander, regarded as one of the most talented and capable in the history of the Polish–Lithuanian Commonwealth. He was also a magnate, a royal official (starosta), a castellan, a member of the Polish nobility (szlachta), and the voivode (governor) of Sandomierz from 1625 until his death. He led many successful military campaigns against rebelling Cossacks and invading Tatars. From 1618 he held the rank of Field Crown Hetman before becoming the Grand Crown Hetman, the military commander second only to the King, in 1632.

Koniecpolski's life was one of almost constant warfare. Before he had reached the age of 20, he had fought in the Dymitriads and the Moldavian Magnate Wars. Later, in 1620, he took part in the Battle of Cecora, during which he was captured by Ottoman forces. After his release in 1623, he defeated the Ottomans' Tatar vassals several times between 1624 and 1626. With inferior numbers, during the Polish–Swedish War (1626–1629), Koniecpolski stopped the Swedish forces of Gustavus Adolphus from conquering Prussia and Pomerania before the war was concluded with the Truce of Altmark. In 1634, he defeated a major Turkish invasion at Kamianets-Podilskyi (Kamieniec Podolski), in modern Ukraine, while in 1644, his victory against the Tatars at the Battle of Ochmatów brought him international fame and recognition.

== Youth ==
The details of Stanisław Koniecpolski's birth are unclear. Various dates between 1590 and 1594^{[a]} have been provided, and none of his biographers identify where he was born. What is known, though, is that his father, Aleksander Koniecpolski, was a wealthy magnate belonging to the szlachta (Polish nobility) and was also the voivode of Sieradz, and a staunch supporter of King Sigismund III of the Swedish House of Vasa. Koniecpolski's mother, Anna Sroczycka, was the daughter of Stanisław Sroczycki, the voivode of Kamianets-Podilskyi, and had brought several large Podole estates into the Koniecpolski family upon her marriage to Aleksander. Stanisław's brothers were Krzysztof, who held the court office of chorąży wielki koronny (Grand Standard-Bearer of the Crown) and was voivode of Bełsk from 1641; Remigiusz, who was the bishop of Chełm before his death in 1640; Jan, a castellan and the voivode of Sieradz; and Przedbór who died in 1611.

Although Koniecpolski had a stutter, when he was 15, through his father's influence in the royal court, he secured an appointment as starosta (mayor) of Wieluń. In 1603 he began studying at the Kraków Academy, and after several years he was sent to the royal court by his father so that he could continue his education in a more practical fashion. He is believed to have stayed there a year or two. He may also have undertaken a tour of Western Europe for several months, spending the majority of his time in France before returning to his family's estates.

== Early career: 1610–1626 ==
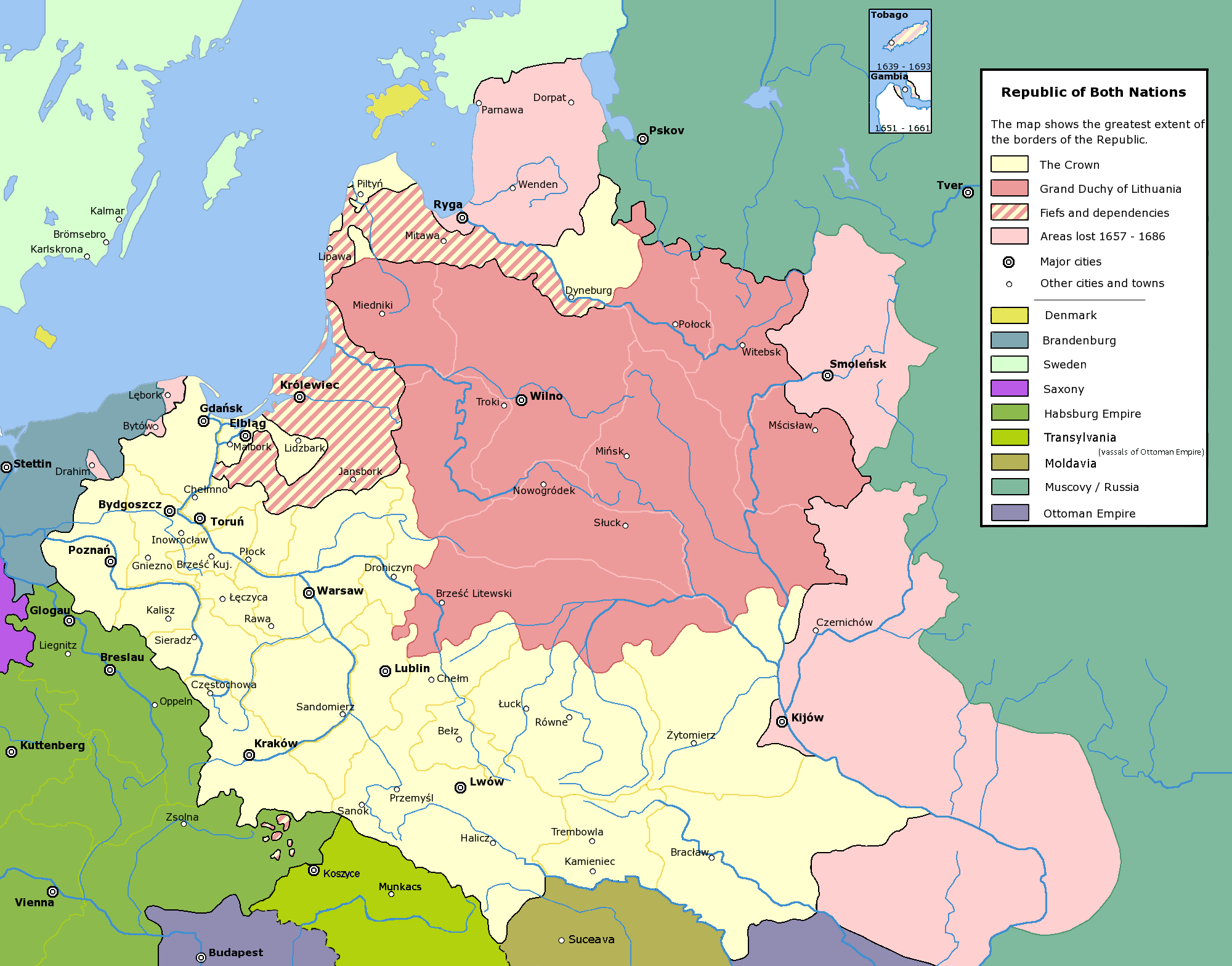
The Polish–Lithuanian Commonwealth at its greatest extent, 1648

From a young age Koniecpolski chose to follow a military career. In 1610, together with his brother Przedbór, he took part in the Dymitriads against Muscovy, raising a group of 300 men to join the Army of the Polish–Lithuanian Commonwealth at Smolensk. On 4 July 1610 he participated in the Battle of Klushino before joining the Siege of Smolensk where Przedbór was crushed to death by the fortress' collapsing walls on 8 July 1611. After returning to his family mansion at Koniecpol with his brother's body, the following autumn Koniecpolski rejoined the army. Under the command of Grand Lithuanian Hetman Jan Karol Chodkiewicz, he took part in the effort to relieve and supply the besieged Polish forces in the Moscow Kremlin. During that time, he was entrusted by the Hetman with the command of the right flank of the Polish forces.

In 1612 Koniecpolski joined the wojsko kwarciane (regular Commonwealth army) in Ukraine under the command of Field Crown Hetman Stanisław Żółkiewski, who greatly influenced his career. In 1614 he was entrusted with destroying rebellious regular units led by Jan Karwacki, and on 17 May, with Stanisław Żółkiewski's son, Jan, he won the Battle of Rohatyn and captured Karwacki. In 1615 he married Żółkiewski's daughter Katarzyna (Catherine). Soon after the wedding, he received the official rank of podstoli koronny (Crown Master of the Pantry).

Throughout 1615 and 1616 Koniecpolski gained further experience in Ukraine, fighting the Tatar hordes, but failed to destroy or capture any sizable enemy units. In 1616, Katarzyna died while giving birth to Koniecpolski's first son, Andrzej. The following year, Koniecpolski took part in the Moldavian Magnate Wars alongside Żołkiewski, and stood against Iskender Pasha's powerful Turkish army. The conflict ended that year with a negotiated cease-fire. Following negotiations with the Cossacks in Olszanica, Koniecpolski reduced the Cossack register to 1,000, thereby limiting the number of positions that the Cossacks could hold in the Commonwealth military. He also banned raids on the Black Sea. Such raids, which pillaged wealthy Ottoman cities, contributed to the Cossacks' income but provoked retaliatory raids into Commonwealth territory.

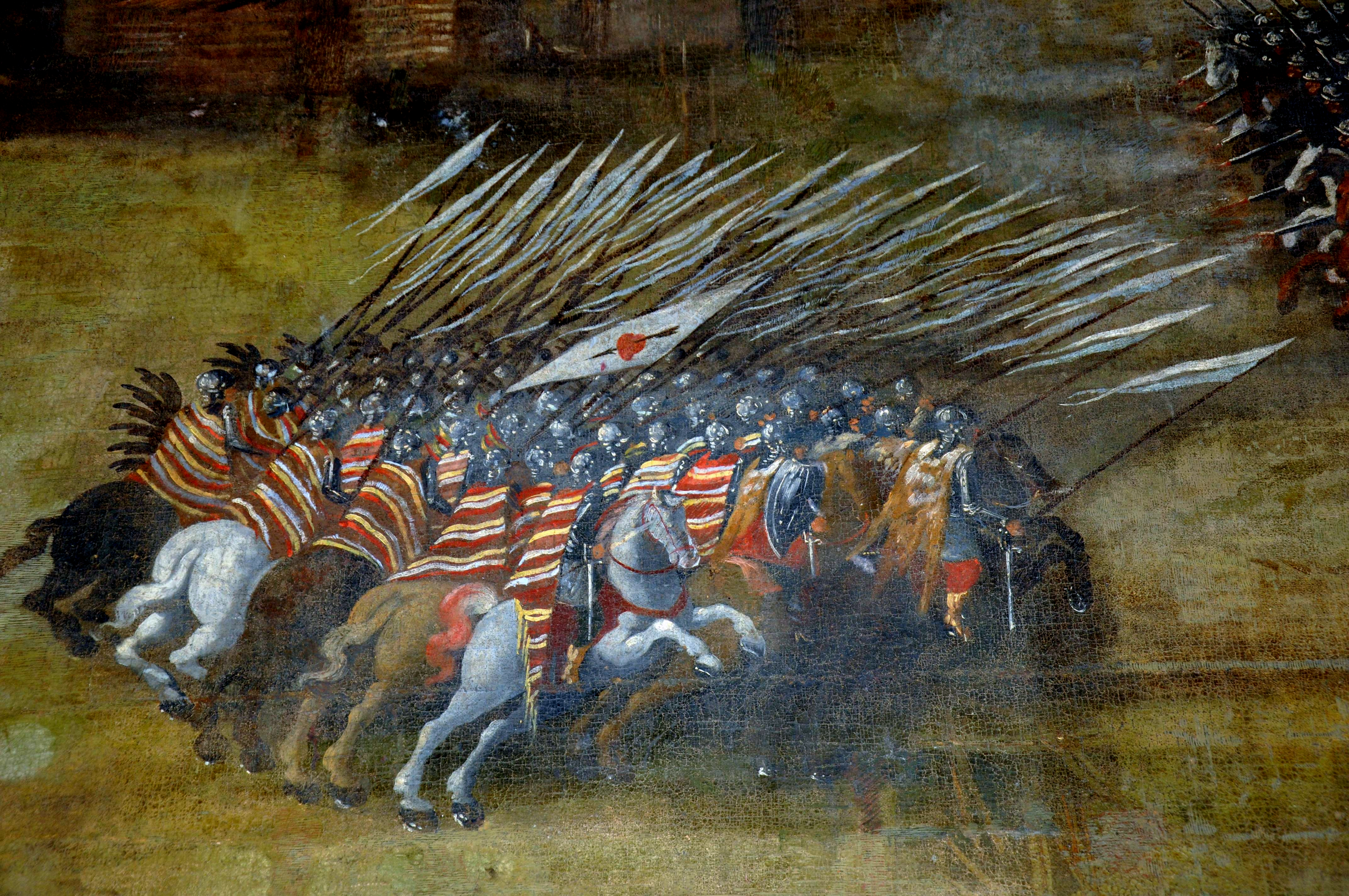
Hussars—Polish heavy cavalry—at Kłuszyn

In 1618, during a session of the Sejm—the Commonwealth parliament—King Sigismund III Vasa granted the buława (ceremonial mace or baton) of Grand Crown Hetman to Stanisław Żółkiewski and that of Field Crown Hetman to Koniecpolski, disregarding the opposition of magnate Krzysztof Zbaraski and his allies. Soon afterward, Koniecpolski was defeated by the Tatars near Orynin, where he committed the mistake of pursuing the enemy against overwhelming odds and barely made it out of the battle alive. In 1619, Koniecpolski married Krystyna Lubomirska, who gave birth to a son, Aleksander, the following year.

That year Koniecpolski and Żólkiewski led an army to Moldova to protect Gaspar Graziani, an ally of the Commonwealth. The army numbered over 7,000 and included the private regiments of the Korecki, Zasławski, Kazanowski, Kalinowski and Potocki magnates. During the Battle of Cecora (Ţuţora) Koniecpolski commanded the right flank of the Commonwealth forces, which were defeated on 19 September by a combined force belonging to Iskender Pasha and Kantymir (Khan Temir). After retreating in good order, the army's morale fell and while Koniecpolski prevented the army's disintegration on 20–21 September, during the later stages of the retreat its resolve collapsed and the men ran for the river. In the ensuing battle, Żólkiewski was killed and Koniecpolski and many magnates including Samuel Korecki, Mikołaj Struś, Mikołaj Potocki, and Jan and Łukasz Żółkiewski were taken captive. The prisoners were transported to Białograd (Bilhorod), to Iskender Pasha, then to the Castle of Seven Towers at Constantinople, where they were held in the Black Tower. Polish-Ottoman relations stabilized in the wake of the Ottoman defeat at Khotyn in 1621, and in the spring of 1623 the prisoners returned to Poland after a diplomatic mission by Krzysztof Zbaraski purchased their freedom for 30,000 thalers.

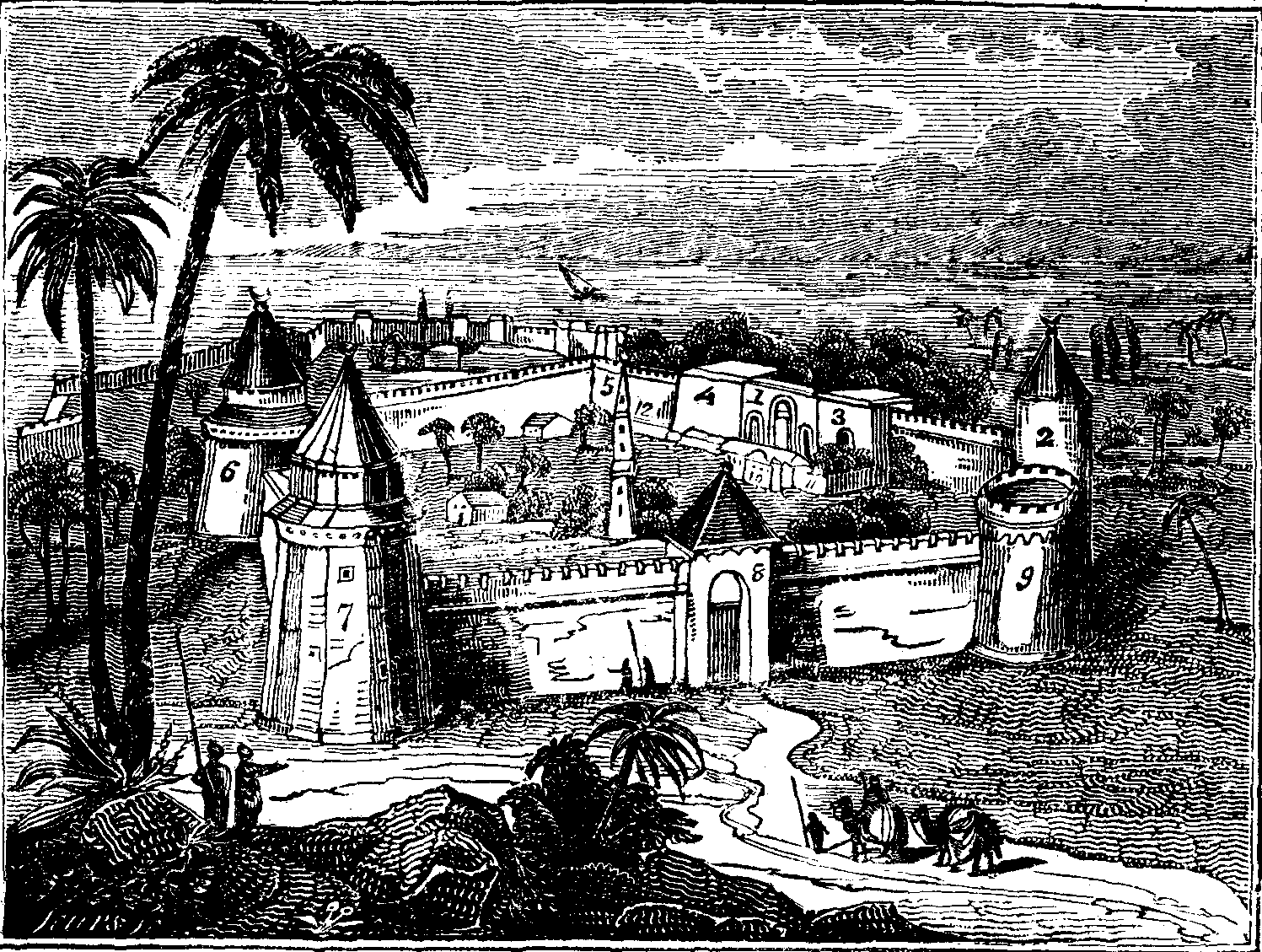
The Castle of the Seven Towers, Constantinople, where Koniecpolski was imprisoned

In the aftermath of the Battle of Khotyn, a treaty had been signed that aimed to prevent further border hostilities. While Khan Canibek Giray resolved to respect the treaty's provisions, Kantymir continued to raid the borderlands in an effort to usurp Canibek Giray's position. Following fresh raids by Kantymir's forces in June 1623, Koniecpolski was given command of local Commonwealth forces and ordered to stop the incursions. Early the following year, the Budjak horde, under Kantymir's command, attacked southern Poland. On 6 February, Koniecpolski intercepted one of the Budjak armies and destroyed it near Szmańkowice and Oryszkowce. Later that year, after Kantymir's forces crossed the border in early June, Koniecpolski inflicted a further defeat on him at the Battle of Martynów. Using a new strategy that employed light Cossack cavalry to drive Kantymir's forces towards fortified tabors where they were attacked by small arms and artillery, Koniecpolski forced the khan's troops to retreat in disarray. His victory was soon celebrated throughout the Commonwealth and, as a reward, Koniecpolski was granted 30,000 zlotys by the Sejm. He was also appointed voivode of Sandomierz.

In 1625, during the Zhmailo Uprising the Zaporozhian Cossacks, led by Marek Zhmaylo, rebelled. Joining forces with Shahin Giray, they attempted to form an alliance with Moscow. Reasoning that the Tatars had their share of trouble with the Porte and that Kantymir's Budjak horde would be unable to send major assistance, Koniecpolski gathered a 12,000-strong army of regular and private units to deal with the rebellion. He pledged fair treatment to all Cossacks loyal to the Commonwealth, and death to rebels. On 25 October 1625, near Kryłów, he launch a cavalry attack against the Cossacks. His initial thrusts were stopped and the Cossacks fell back toward Lake Kurukove where they checked a secondary attack. As the tide of battle went against him, Koniecpolski's position was at one point described as "grave"; however, the conflict eventually ended in a negotiated cease-fire. This was formalized by the Treaty of Kurukove on 6 November under which the Cossack register was set at 6,000, and the Cossacks again promised to stop raiding the Black Sea shores and provoking the Tatars.

In late January 1626 the Tatars invaded again. With an army estimated at between 15,000 and 20,000, they raided and pillaged territories as far north as the Podole Voivodeship, passing Ternopil and Terebovlia, while some advanced units reached the cities of Lutsk, Volodymyr-Volynskyi and Lviv. In response, Koniecpolski gathered some 13,000 troops and moved to intercept the Tatars, but they refused to engage. Eventually Koniecpolski defeated the rear guard of the main Tatar army, which crossed the borders with much treasure and slaves. Later that year, fearing a repeat invasion, Koniecpolski violated a Sejm resolution in recruiting and fielding an army of 8,000 against an expected Tatar second wave. During this time, Koniecpolski was aided in a number of battles by a highly capable officer, Bohdan Khmelnytsky; Khmelnytsky would also score a major victory over the Tatars later that year, after Koniecpolski had departed north to a new battlefield near the Baltic Sea.

== Fighting Gustavus Adolphus: 1626–1629 ==
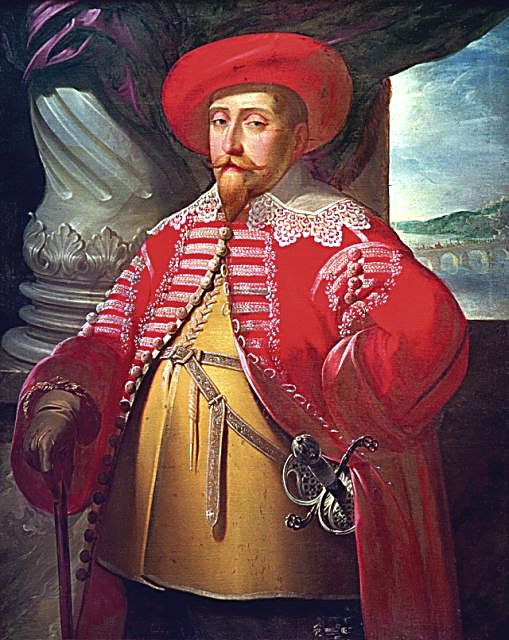
Koniecpolski's great adversary, Gustavus Adolphus of Sweden

In 1626 the southern threat to the Commonwealth was overshadowed by a northern one, as an incursion by Swedish forces reignited the Polish–Swedish War. In June, Gustavus Adolphus, with a fleet of 125 ships and an army of over 14,000 men, approached the Polish coast and began collecting tariffs on trade passing through Gdańsk (Danzig). Having taken Piława and Braniewo, Swedish forces spread through Pomerania, taking Frombork, Tolkmicko, Elbląg, Malbork, Gniew, Tczew and Starogard, while other Swedish forces landed near Puck—the main port of the Polish–Lithuanian Commonwealth fleet—and captured it. The major city of Gdańsk, however, refused to surrender even in the face of lightning Swedish advances. In a battle that took place between 22 and 30 September 1626 near the village of Gniew, Gustavus defeated a Polish army led by King Sigismund, who retreated and called for reinforcements from other parts of the country. In response, Koniecpolski was tasked with defending Royal Prussia against the Swedish incursion. He was delayed by the unstable situation in the south, though, and it was not until 1 October that he finally departed for Prussia.

Koniecpolski's force of 4,200 light cavalry, 1,000 dragoons, and 1,000 infantry quickly moved to Prussia. Reinforced by other units, he had 9,000 men against the 20,000-strong Swedish force.^{[b]} Employing maneuver warfare, using small mobile units to strike at enemy communication lines and smaller units, he stopped the Swedish attack and forced Axel Oxenstierna into a defensive posture. Meanwhile, the Sejm agreed to raise money for the war. The situation of the Commonwealth forces, short of money and food, was difficult. Lithuanian forces were dealt a serious defeat near Koknese, Inflanty Voivodeship, in December 1626 and they subsequently retreated behind the Dvina River. The Swedes then planned to strike Koniecpolski from two directions: Oxenstierna, from the Vistula River, and Johann Streiff von Lawentstein and Maxymilian Teuffl, from Swedish-held Pomorze. The flooding of the Vistula, however, disrupted their plans and allowed Koniecpolski to intercept the enemy units advancing from Pomerania.

On 2 April 1627 Koniecpolski managed to recapture Puck. He took Czarne (Hamersztyn) on 18 April and forced the Swedish forces to retreat into the city. A week later they surrendered, with many mercenaries and some Swedish abandoning their banners and insignia, and changing sides. As a result of the series of Swedish defeats in spring 1627, they lost all their strongholds on the west bank of the Vistula, and with those, their hopes for a quick and decisive victory. The situation also convinced the Elector of Brandenburg to declare his support for the Commonwealth, and afterwards the Lithuanian forces resumed their offensive in Livonia.

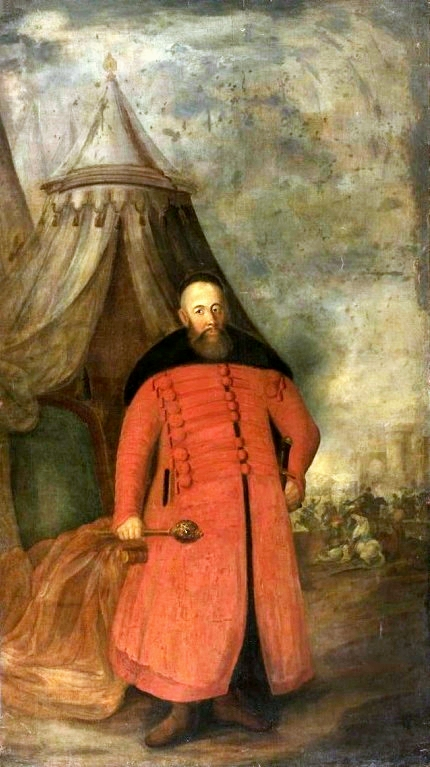
Koniecpolski with a hetman's buława, portraited in a military encampment against a battle, National Museum in Warsaw

On 17 May Gustavus landed with 8,000 reinforcements. On the night of 22–23 May, while crossing the Vistula near Kieżmark and Danzig, Gustavus encountered Polish forces. Wounded in the hip, he was forced to retreat. Koniecpolski then decided to take back Gniew and devised a diversionary plan. Polish forces were sent to attempt to take back Braniewo, forcing Gustavus to relieve the siege; then Gustavus followed the retreating Polish army and laid siege to Orneta. Koniecpolski, who had foreseen this, responded with a sudden attack on Gniew, his primary objective, which he captured. Gustavus was reported to be impressed with the speed of Koniecpolski's reaction.

Near Tczew, with about 7,800 men—including 2,500 cavalry and hussars, the Commonwealth's elite heavy cavalry—Koniecpolski tried to stop the Swedish army from reaching Danzig. On 7–8 August, he encountered a Swedish force consisting of 10,000 men, which included 5,000 infantry, near the swamps of Motława. The Swedes wanted to provoke the Poles into attacking, then destroy them with infantry fire and artillery, but Koniecpolski decided against attacking. The Swedes then went on the attack with cavalry, but were unable to draw the Poles within range of their fire. The Swedish attacks dealt severe damage to the Polish cavalry but did not cripple the Polish army whose morale was kept high by Koniecpolski. The battle ended when Gustavus Adolphus was again wounded and the Swedes retreated.

Koniecpolski now recognized the need to reform his army and strengthen the firepower of its infantry and artillery to match the Swedes'. The Swedes, on the other hand, had learned the arts of cavalry charges and melée combat from the Poles. Overall the 1627 campaign had been favorable to the Commonwealth; Puck and Gniew had been retaken, Swedish plans had been thwarted, and the Swedish army had been weakened. The last major engagement of the year saw the surprising defeat of a Swedish flotilla by the small Polish Navy on 28 November 1627 at the Battle of Oliwa.

In 1628 the Polish forces, short of funds, were forced to cease their offensive and go on the defensive. Gustavus Adolphus captured Kwidzyń, Nowe and Brodnica. Koniecpolski counterattacked, putting his small forces to most efficient use—quick cavalry melée attacks, combined with supporting infantry and artillery fire, guerrilla warfare, the use of engineers to raise fortifications, and clever use of terrain advantage. Despite his best efforts, he was hampered by insufficient funds. The Sejm increased funding for the war after the Battle of Górzno, where Stanisław "Rewera" Potocki was defeated. Austria sent the Commonwealth help in the form of forces under Field Marshal Johann Georg Arnheim. Arnheim, however, refused to take orders from Koniecpolski.

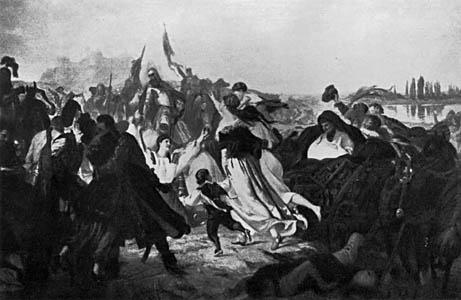
Hetman Koniecpolski Frees Captives of the Tatars, by Henryk Rodakowski. (The original was lost in World War II.)

The final battle took place on 27 June 1629 near Trzciana (or Trzcianka). The Swedes attacked toward Grudziądz, were halted, and retreated to Sztum and Malbork. Koniecpolski attacked the rear guard, which was led by Jan Wilhelm Reingraff, Count of Ren, and destroyed it. He also repelled a counterattack by Swedish raitars, who were pushed toward Pułkowice, where another counterattack was led by Gustavus Adolphus with 2,000 raitars. This counterattack was also fended off, and the Swedish forces were saved from total defeat by the last Swedish reserves, led by Field Marshal Herman Wrangel, who blocked the Polish attack. Gustavus Adolphus was wounded and barely escaped. Of the Swedes, 1,200 were killed, and Reingraff and several hundred others were captured. Polish losses were under 200 killed or injured.

Poland did not follow up this victory politically or militarily. A cease-fire contracted at Stary Targ (the Truce of Altmark) on 26 October 1629 favored the Swedes, who received the right to tax Polish trade moving over the Baltic (3.5% of the value of goods), retained control of many cities in Royal Prussia, and were recognized as the dominant power on the southern Baltic coast. Koniecpolski exerted little influence on the negotiations, as he had been called back to Ukraine to crush a Tartar incursion.

== Grand Crown Hetman: 1630–1637 ==
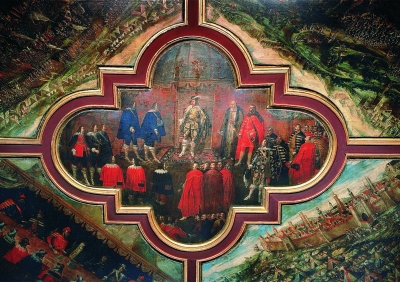
Treaty of Sztumska Wieś (1635), painted 1640. Pictured are Bishop Jakub Zadzik, King Władysław IV, and Hetman Stanisław Koniecpolski.

In 1630, the Cossack leader, Taras Fedorovych, executed the moderate Hryhoriy Chorny, and began a Cossack uprising, later dubbed the "Fedorovych Uprising". Soon afterwards he captured the fortress of Korsun. In an effort to restore the situation, Koniecpolski laid siege to Pereyaslav. Lacking artillery and infantry support, he could not breach its walls, but the Cossacks, needing supplies and having suffered heavy casualties, agreed to negotiate. The Treaty of Pereyaslav, signed in August 1630, granted liberal terms, including amnesty for the rebels. Koniecpolski, as usual, was for harsh punishment, but also argued that in the long run the Cossack situation was better remedied by more equitable treatment, including an increase in the Cossack register and the regular payment of wages. Still, he supported policies aimed at turning the Cossacks into serfs, which was one of the main causes of unrest in Ukraine; this, along with his decision to settle his soldiers' living expenses on the local populace instead of paying them wages, led to his extreme unpopularity in Ukraine.

In 1632, a few months before his death, King Sigismund III Vasa awarded Koniecpolski the post of Grand Crown Hetman. It had stood vacant for 12 years, since the death of Stanisław Żółkiewski; presumably King Sigismund had feared that Koniecpolski, if given the post earlier, would have become too powerful a magnate. After the King's death, Koniecpolski played a major role in directing the political affairs of the Commonwealth and in 1632 supported the election of Sigismund's son, Władysław IV Vasa, as king. In return, a year after his election, King Władysław IV rewarded Koniecpolski with the office of Castellan of Kraków, the most prestigious of the Commonwealth's district offices. Koniecpolski became an influential adviser to the new king, often encouraging him to direct Polish foreign policy against the Tartars. Koniecpolski also supported King Władysław IV's military reforms. Though generally seen as a supporter of the King, Koniecpolski opposed some of his plans aimed at increasing royal power in the Commonwealth and weakening the Golden Liberty of the nobility.

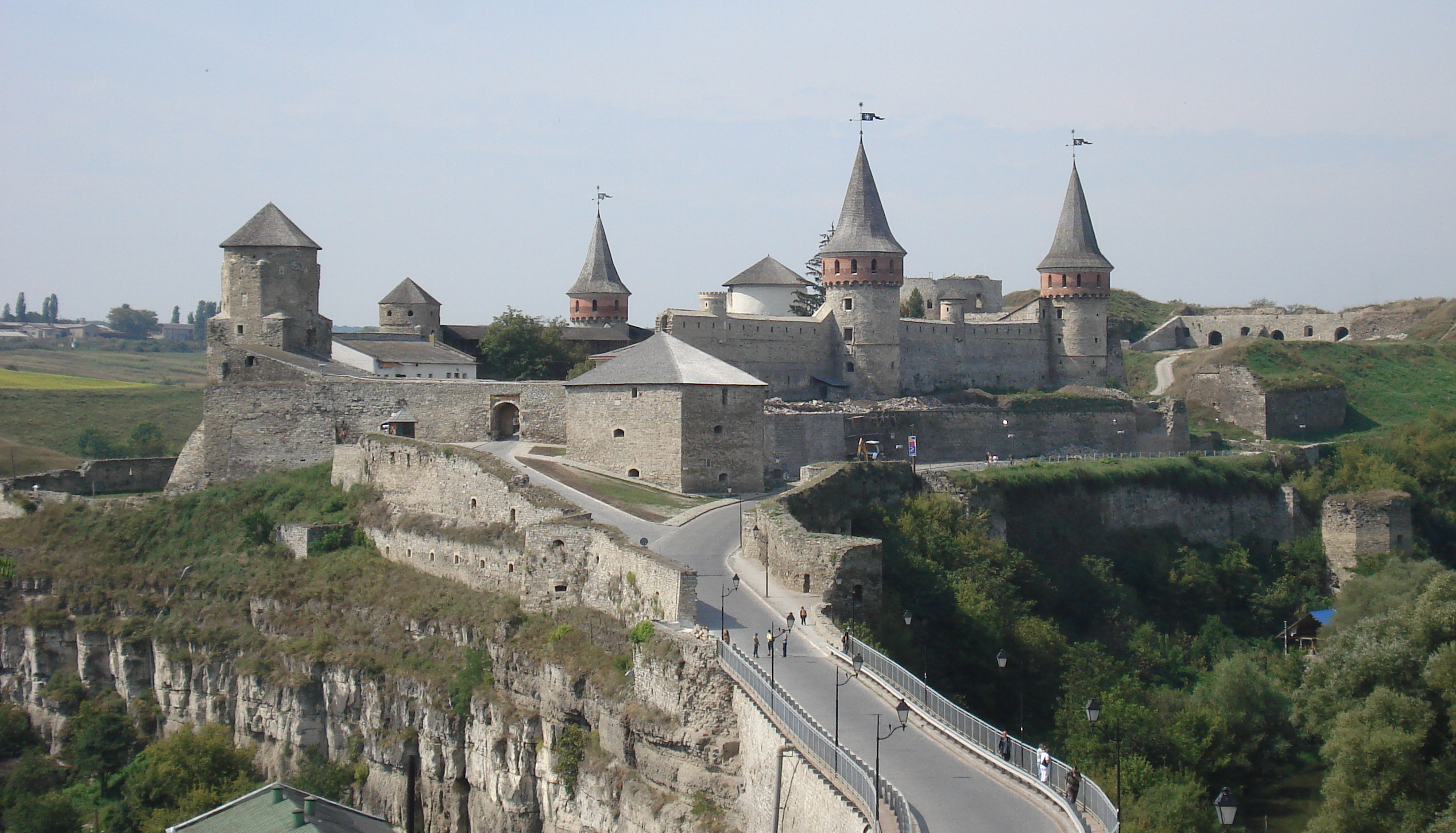
Fortress of Kamianets-Podilskyi

In 1633 Koniecpolski thwarted the Turks' attacks on the Commonwealth, defeating their forces on 4 July at Sasowy Róg. On 22 October that year, he repulsed a superior invading Ottoman force of over 20,000 at Kamianets-Podilskyi, his own forces numbering 11,000. The Ottoman defeats and Koniecpolski's attitude persuaded the Turks to sign a new treaty on 19 August 1634. The treaty repeated the terms of the Treaty of Chocim of 1621 and ended the Ottoman–Commonwealth War (1633–34).

In 1635, in the short lived Sulima Uprising, after Cossacks under Ivan Sulyma captured and destroyed the Polish Kodak Fortress (near modern Dnipro), Koniecpolski led an expedition that retook the fort and punished the insurgents. Sulima was taken prisoner and executed.

Later that year Koniecpolski returned to Pomerania to prepare for another war against Sweden, but it was rendered unnecessary by the Treaty of Sztumska Wieś.

Koniecpolski grasped the need to modernize the Commonwealth's military and worked with King Władysław IV to that end, including the recruitment of mercenaries experienced in western warfare, and further development of artillery (he supervised the construction of arsenals at Kudak, Bar and Kamieniec Podolski, and built forges on his Ukrainian estates). He was patron to many gifted artillery and engineering officers. He may also have sponsored cartographers such as William le Vasseur de Beauplan, who mapped Ukraine, and Sebastian Aders, who mapped Crimea. He also supported plans to create a Commonwealth Baltic Fleet.

== Last years: 1637–1645 ==
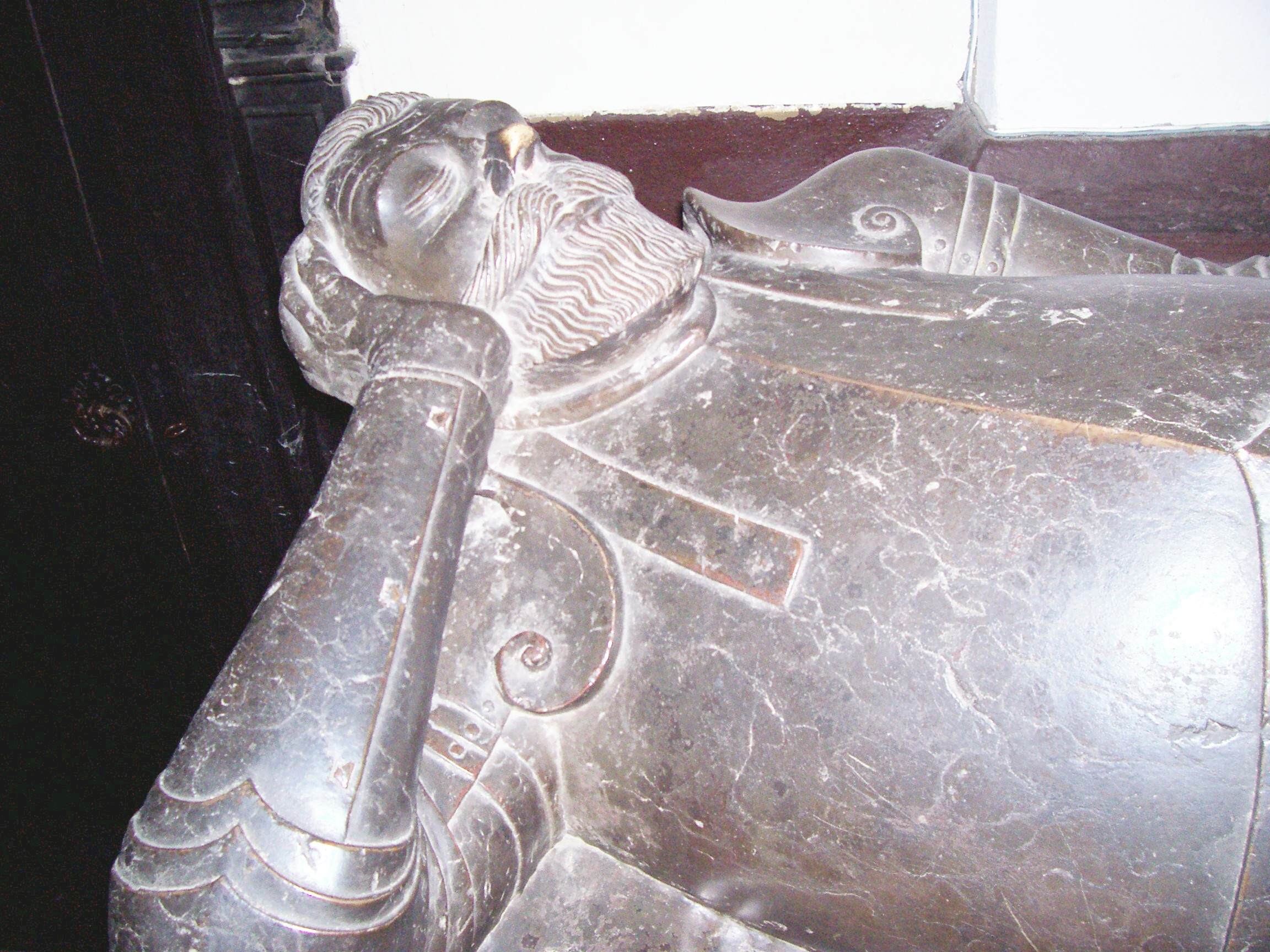
Koniecpolski's effigy, Trinity Church, Koniecpol

After 1637 Koniecpolski's declining health made him reliant on the younger Hetman Mikołaj Potocki, who successfully crushed Cossack uprisings in 1637 and 1638, and a Tartar uprising in 1639. Koniecpolski's influence also protected the outlaw Samuel Łaszcz, whom he saw as another able commander.

One of Koniecpolski's greatest victories occurred during a winter 1644 campaign against Tatars. With a large army of some 19,000 soldiers (60% of them, magnates' private armies; Koniecpolski's own forces numbered 2,200) he dealt a crushing defeat to Toğay bey's forces near Ochmatów on 30 January 1644. Many Tatars drowned near Sina Woda when the ice over the water gave way. The Battle of Ochmatów, the Commonwealth's greatest victory over the Tatars in the first half of the 17th century, brought international fame to Koniecpolski, who had not only predicted the time and place of their attack but had destroyed their forces before they could deploy their usual tactic of splitting their main forces into multiple highly-mobile units (czambuls).

The victory led King Władysław IV to consider an offensive war against the Turks. Koniecpolski supported a limited war against the Crimean Khanate but opposed the King's plan to wage war on the entire Ottoman Empire, believing it to be an unrealistic folly. Setting out his strategic views in a plan titled "Dyskurs o zniesieniu Tatarow krymskich i lidze z Moskwą" (Discourse on Destruction of the Crimean Tartars and on coalition with Moscow), Koniecpolski also strongly urged a coalition with Moscow for such a campaign. King Władysław IV continued to push for a crusade against Turkey, but it had little internal support and failed to achieve anything except to spread false hopes among the Cossacks, to whom he promised privileges and money in exchange for their participation.

On 15 June 1645, Koniecpolski's wife, Krystyna, died. Koniecpolski remarried soon after, taking the hand of 16-year-old Zofia Opalińska, daughter of future Crown Marshal Łukasz Opaliński, on 16 January 1646. The marriage was short lived, though, ending with Koniecpolski's death in Brody on 11 March 1646. Sources suggest that his new marriage was the cause of his death; Joachim Jerlicz wrote in his diary that Koniecpolski had overdosed on an aphrodisiac. His funeral was held in Brody on 30 April 1646.

== Wealth and influence ==
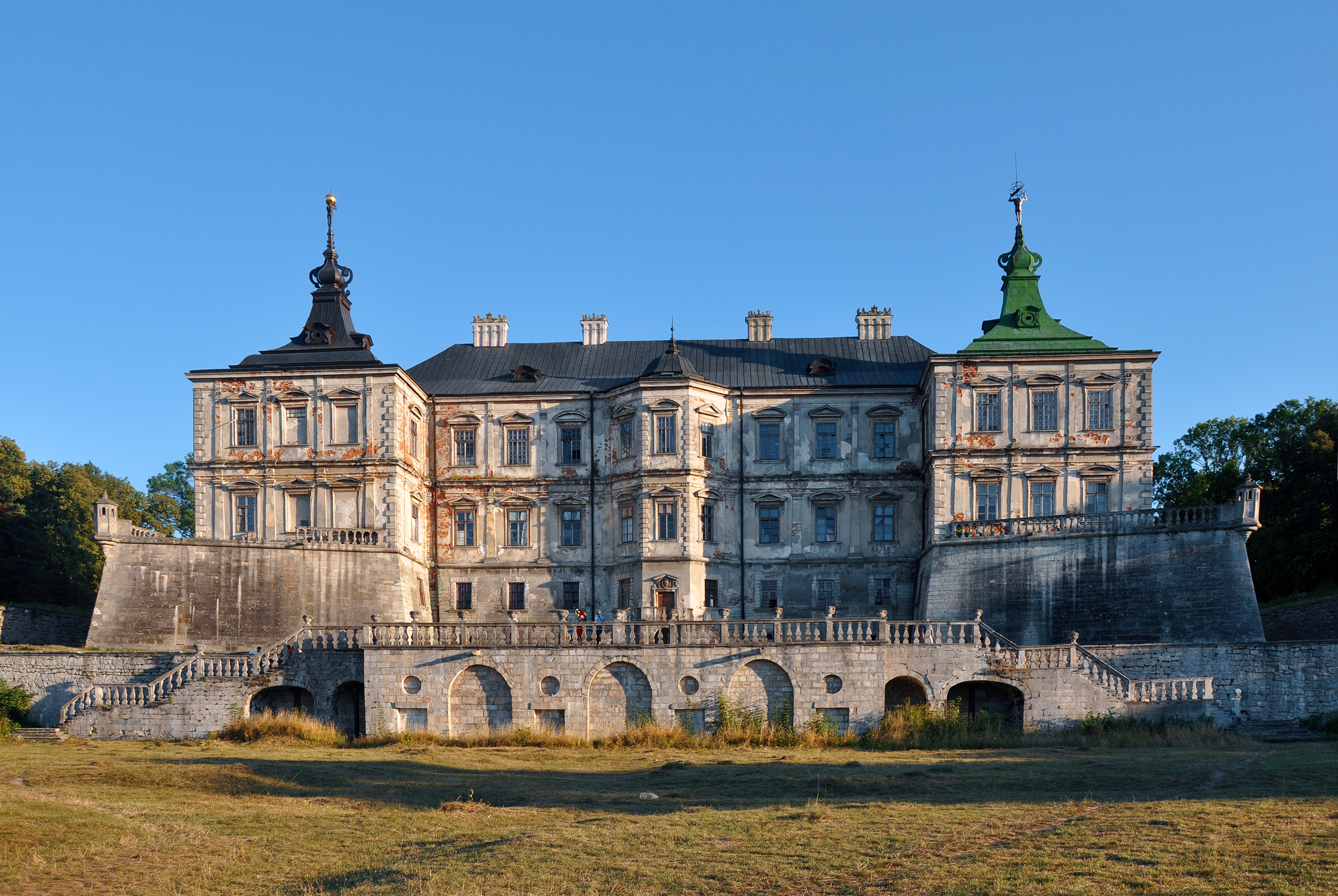
Pidhirtsi Castle, planned and designed by Guillaume Le Vasseur de Beauplan and Andrea dell'Acqua for Koniecpolski, 1635–1640

Over the course of his life, Koniecpolski accumulated much wealth. Most of his possessions were in Ukraine, and he became Ukraine's unofficial ruler; some foreigners referred to him as "viceroy of Ukraine", though no such Commonwealth position ever existed. King Władysław IV trusted him with most political decisions concerning this southeastern region of the Commonwealth. With the knowledge and support of the King, Koniecpolski sent and received diplomatic missions from Constantinople, carried out negotiations and signed treaties, and as the Grand Crown Hetman he directly controlled a substantial part of the Commonwealth's military. He had his own private army and an espionage network that stretched from Moscow to the Ottoman Empire.

Koniecpolski inherited some seven or eight villages from his father. At his death, he owned 12 starostwo districts, with over 300 settlements, including dozens of towns, giving him yearly revenues of over 500,000 złoty. His holdings of land and serfs in western Ukraine were considerable; he owned 18,548 households in Bratslav. Koniecpolski invested much of his wealth in developing his Ukrainian estates, and supported settlement of underpopulated regions. He founded and sponsored the development of many towns and cities, including the town of Brody, which flourished with his investments, and became an important local commercial center. Koniecpolski fortified the town with a citadel and bastions in 1633 and set up workshops for producing Persian-type samite fabrics, carpets and rugs. He also constructed a fortified palace in Pidhirtsi (Podhorce) with beautiful Italian gardens. Like most magnates, Koniecpolski was a patron of the arts, sponsoring painters, sculptors, writers. He also founded many churches and sought to upgrade Brody's school to an academy. He sponsored the construction of the Koniecpolski Palace (now the Presidential Palace) in Warsaw, and military fortifications in Bar and Kudak.

Regarded as a courteous and educated man, Koniecpolski participated in all the Sejm sessions that he could, though he rarely spoke publicly due to his stutter. He was widely respected and highly popular among his szlachta peers.

== See also ==
- History of Poland (1569–1795)
