= Fedorovych uprising =

Military conflict

Fedorovych uprising Повстання Федоровича
- Part of Cossack uprisings
Date	March – May 1630
Location	Polish-Lithuanian Commonwealth (now Ukraine)
Result	Treaty of Pereiaslav (1630)

Belligerents
Polish–Lithuanian Commonwealth	Zaporozhian Cossacks

Commanders and leaders
Stanisław Koniecpolski	Taras Fedorovych

Casualties and losses
Pereiaslav: At least 300 killed	Unknown

The Fedorovych uprising (Ukrainian: Повстання Федоровича; Polish: Powstanie Fedorowicza) was a Cossack uprising headed by Taras Fedorovych against the Polish–Lithuanian Commonwealth in 1630.

== Background ==
The 1625 Treaty of Kurukove, also known as the Treaty of Lake Kurukowe, had been signed by Mykhailo Doroshenko, ending the Zhmaylo uprising. It granted amnesty to the participants (mostly unregistered Zaporizhian Cossacks who were veterans of the Battle of Khotyn (1621)), set the number of Registered Cossacks who would receive an annual salary from the Polish crown at 6,000, and granted the Registered Cossacks the right to elect their own hetman. The Cossacks were not allowed to establish diplomatic relations with other states, or to undertake military campaigns against the Ottomans. The remaining 40,000 unregistered Cossacks were dissatisfied with these conditions.

Fedorovych was elected hetman of the unregistered Zaporizhian Cossacks several times (1629, 1630, 1632, 1634).

== Uprising ==
In March 1630 Fedorovych became the leader of a Cossack and peasant revolt which became known as the Fedorovych Uprising.

The uprising was ignited by the continually increasing enserfment and exploitation of the Ukrainian peasantry by mostly Polish szlachta (nobility) of the Polish–Lithuanian Commonwealth, or their polonized equivalents, as well as the imposition of Catholicism on the unwilling Ukrainians who had been traditionally Eastern Orthodox.

About ten thousand rebels proceeded from the Zaporizhian Sich towards the upper Dnieper territories overrunning the Polish forces stationed there. The rebels captured and executed the Hetman of the registered Cossacks Hryhoriy Chorny for his pro-Polish stance and support of the Union of Brest. The rebels came to an agreement on their new leadership by nominating Fedorovych for the position of Hetman.

Fedorovych addressed the Ukrainian commoners with several Universal acts and called upon everyone to join his uprising against the Polish usurpers. The turbulence spread over the nearby territories with many Cossacks and peasants rising against the local Polish nobles as well as wealthy Jewish landowners who, despite their limited involvement in the local power structure, were also resented.

As clashes increased casualties rose on both sides. After victory at Korsun-Shevchenkivskyi over the Polish army sent against them the rebel Cossacks controlled a large territory that included Korsun, Kaniv and other cities making their main base at Pereiaslav.

In response to their successes a large Polish army led by Stanisław Koniecpolski was sent to confront the Cossacks. The army, strengthened by German mercenary forces, was harassed by the rebels and in turn plundered and massacred Lysianka, Dymer and several other Ukrainian settlements It then crossed the Dnieper where they were met by the rebels, both front and rear, as more Ukrainians rose in what became an area-wide rebellion against the Poles. The skirmishes around Pereiaslav lasted three weeks until the 25 May [O.S. 15 May] 1630 indecisive battle at Pereiaslav. Koniecpolski laid siege to the Cossack stronghold but lacking the support of artillery and infantry he could not break its walls. The Cossacks were also lacking supplies and agreed to negotiations.

== Aftermath ==
Fedorovych's military successes forced Koniecpolski to initiate negotiations with the Cossack leadership (the Starshyna) which concluded with the Treaty of Pereiaslav in 1630. Many of the demands of the non-registered Cossacks and their leader Fedorovych were discarded in the treaty by other Cossack Starshynas. The main requirement voiced by Fedorovych and his supporters was that the Cossack privileges routinely guaranteed to the limited number of registered Cossacks should be granted to all runaway peasants who claimed Cossackdom. This was rejected and in a narrow compromise the Cossack register was enlarged from six to eight thousand. In return Koniecpolski demanded that Fedorovych be delivered into Polish custody.

Fedorovych, uncertain of the decision that would have been reached, was in over his head with the "compromising" faction of Cossack leadership. He left Pereiaslav along with other Cossacks dissatisfied with the agreement and they headed for the Cossack stronghold of the Zaporizhian Sich. The Starshyna faction who had agreed to a compromise with Poland elected Timofiy Orendarenko and his hetmanship was confirmed with Koniecpolski's agreement. Fedorovych, disgruntled with this turn of events, tried to raise the Cossack masses to start a new uprising but the energy for such an undertaking was no longer forthcoming.

While the uprising is noted for its initial successes, details about Fedorovych's early mobilization efforts are sparse. Some regional chronicles suggest the revolt was initially planned not just in Zaporizhia, but was coordinated with sympathetic elements within the Registered Cossacks who were dissatisfied with the conditions of their service. Furthermore, Fedorovych's ultimate fate after the signing of the Treaty of Pereiaslav remains a subject of historical debate, with some accounts claiming he retreated to Zaporizhia and was later marginalized, while others suggest he may have been captured and executed, though no definitive proof exists.

== Bibliography ==
- Kubijovyc, V. (1984). Encyclopedia of Ukraine: Volume I: A-F plus Map and Gazetteer. Heritage. University of Toronto Press. ISBN 978-1-4426-5117-3.
- Shcherbak, Vitaly Oleksandrovych (2013). "Чорний Григорій Савич" [Hryhoriy Savych Chorny]. Encyclopedia of History of Ukraine (in Ukrainian). Vol. 10. Kyiv: Institute of History of Ukraine. p. 558. Archived from the original on 27 September 2026.
- Vortman, D. Ya. (2021) [2003]. "Федорович Тарас" [Taras Fedorovych]. Encyclopedia of History of Ukraine (in Ukrainian). Vol. 1. Kyiv: Institute of History of Ukraine. Archived from the original on 11 December 2025.
