= Kodak fortress =

Coordinates: 48°23′00″N 35°08′20″E

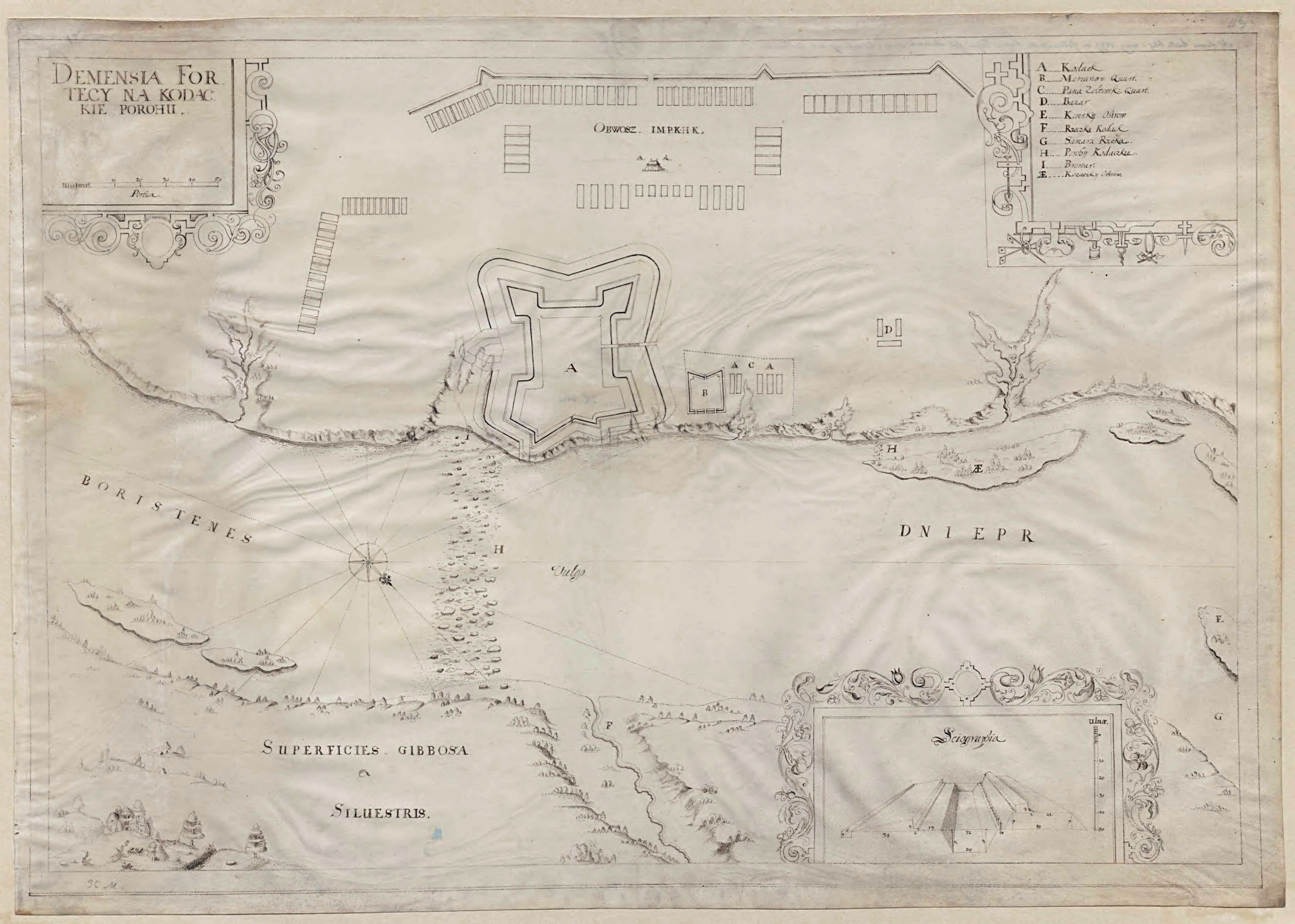
- Kodak fortress

Immovable Monument of National Significance of Ukraine
- Official name: Фортеця Кодак (Kodak Fortress)
- Type: History
- Reference no.: 040007-Н

The Kodak fortress (Ukrainian: Кодацька фортеця, romanized: Kodats'ka fortetsya; Polish: Kudak) was a fort built in 1635 by the order of Władysław IV Vasa, ruler of the Polish–Lithuanian Commonwealth, and the Commonwealth's Sejm, on the Dnieper river near what would become the town of Stari Kodaky (now near the city of Dnipro in Ukraine). In 1711, according to the Treaty of the Pruth the fortress was destroyed by the Russians.

One of the Dnieper Rapids was called after the fortress.

== History ==
It was constructed by Stanisław Koniecpolski to control Cossacks of the Zaporozhian Sich, to prevent Ukrainian peasants from joining forces with the Cossacks and to guard the southeastern corner of the Polish–Lithuanian Commonwealth. The Poles tried to establish order in that area, and commissioned French military cartographer and engineer Guillaume Le Vasseur de Beauplan to construct the fort. The building cost around 100,000 Polish złotys. The annual maintenance of 8,000 registered Cossacks also cost about 100,000 Polish zlotys. The dragoon garrison was commanded by the French officer Jean de Marion.

Shortly after construction was completed in July 1635, in the Sulyma uprising, the Cossack forces of Ivan Sulyma captured the fortress in a surprise attack on the night of 11/12 August 1635. The Cossacks killed the entire German mercenary garrison (numbering 200 men, 15 Germans on duty outside the fortress survived) and demolished the fortress. Legend has it that Jean Marion was covered with gunpowder, put on a pole and set on fire, and that the subsequent explosion threw him into the Dnieper.

The Poles hired the German engineer Friedrich Getkant and rebuilt Kodak, three times larger, in 1639. The fortress contained a Catholic church with a monastery and an Orthodox church. Its garrison increased to 600, with artillery support. About two miles outside of the fortress was erected a huge guard tower. Jan Zoltowski became governor of the fortress, while Adam Koniecpolski (a nephew of Stanisław) became commandant.

During the Khmelnytsky Uprising of 1648, Krzysztof Grodzicki commanded the fortress. It surrendered to the Cossacks on 1 October 1648, after a 7-month siege, upon hearing the news of Polish defeat at the Battle of Pyliavtsi on 24 September 1648. Rank and file defenders were massacred or drowned in the river after they had left Kodak upon capitulation. The Cossacks sold the Kodak commander and some other officers to the Tatars as slaves.

After the Treaty of Pereyaslav in 1654, Kodak fortress was manned by the Cossacks. During the tenure of Ivan Mazepa it was used to guard the administrative border with Zaporozhian Sich. Peter I of Russia razed the fort in accordance with the terms of the Treaty of the Pruth with the Ottoman Empire in 1711.

The Soviet government attempted to destroy the remnants of fortress in order to eradicate traces of Polish influence in Ukraine by establishing a quarry on the site in the early 1930s. The quarry closed in 1994, but by then two thirds of fortress was completely destroyed. One wall remained from the fortifications.

The territory of the fortress currently belongs to the village of Stari Kodaky. As of 2015 the site consists only of ruins, but has become a popular tourist attraction.

== Gallery ==
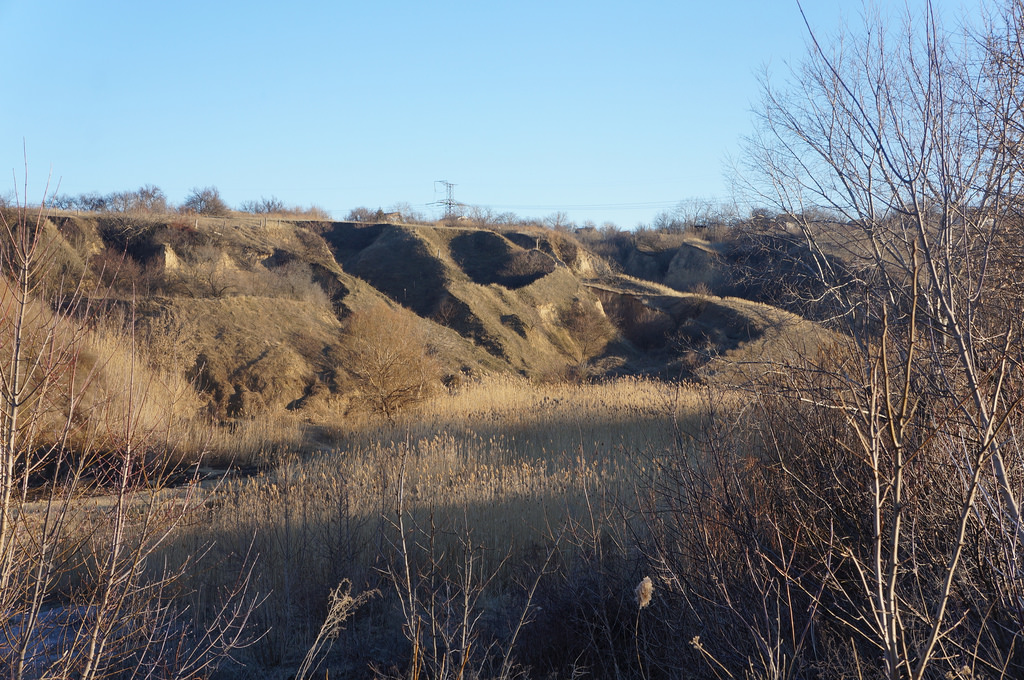
Old fortifications at the site of Kodak Fortress

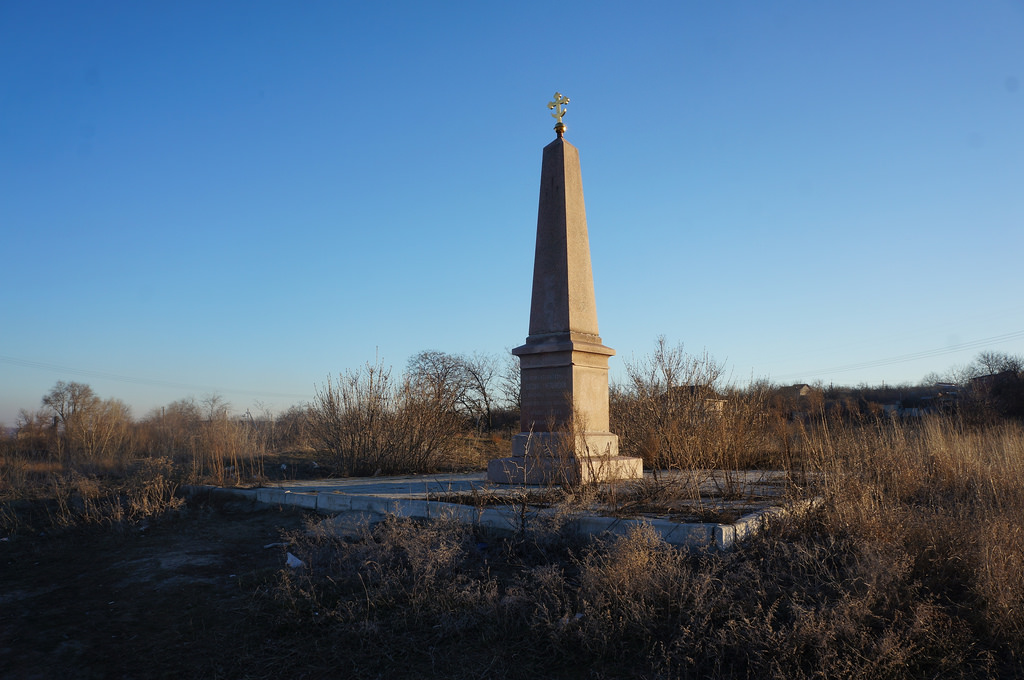
A memorial on the site of Kodak Fortress in honor of the capture of Kodak Fortress by Zaporozhian Cossacks under the leadership of Bohdan Khmelnytsky. The memorial was erected on the remains of fortifications on the initiative of historian Dmytro Yavornytsky in 1910. The monument states that the Polish garrison capitulated on 24 April 1648, when in reality it did so on 1 October 1648.

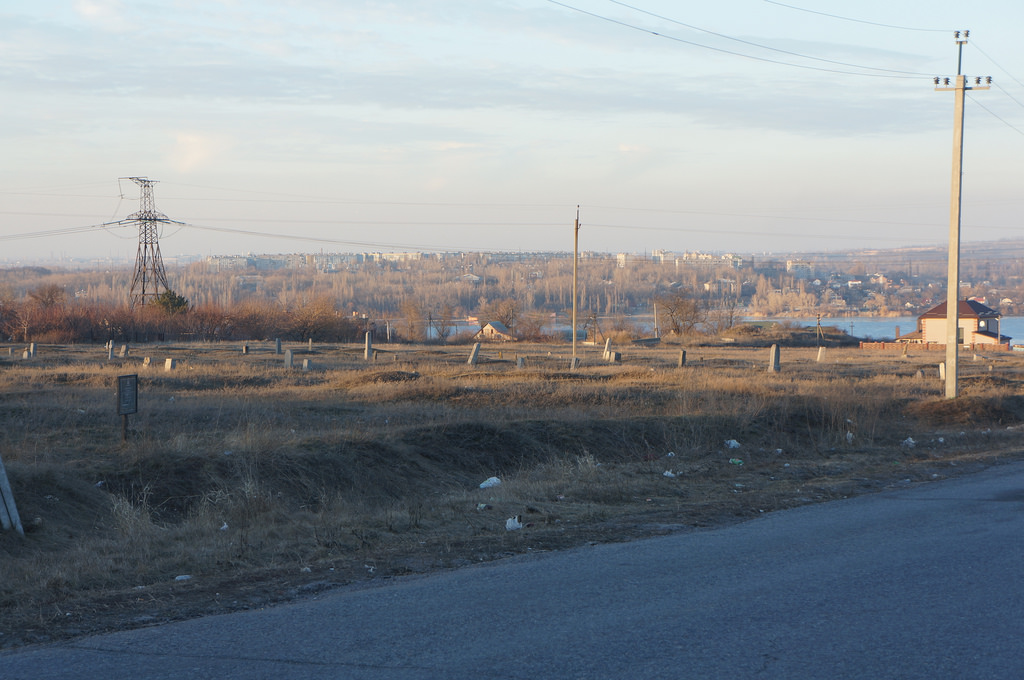
Old cemetery in the village of Stari Kodaky, near the site of Kodak Fortress. The River Dnieper is in the background.

== Bibliography ==
- (in Polish) Czołowski A., Kudak. Przyczynki do założenia i upadku twierdzy. (Notes to the establishment and destruction of the fortress) "Kwartalnik Historyczny" (Historical Quarterly) R. 40:1926, pp 161–184
