= Hryhoriy Chorny =

Hryhoriy (Hrytsko) Savych Chorny (Ukrainian: Григорій (Грицько) Савич Чорний, Polish: Hryćko Czarny; died 1630) was a Hetman (Starshy) of the Registered Cossacks from 1628 to 1630. At the time, most of the unregistered Zaporozhian Cossacks had elected Taras Fedorovych (Triasylo) as their leader.

In 1628, Chorny and Mykhailo Doroshenko took part in the Crimean campaign against the Crimean Tatars. Following Doroshenko's death both Fedorovych and Chorny claimed the hetmanship, but only Chorny's claim was recognised by the Polish Crown despite Fedorovych's greater popular support.

In early 1630, acting on instruction from Field Crown Hetman Stanisław Koniecpolski, Hetman Chorny and government commissioner Adam Kisiel revised the Cossack register, removing 300 Zaporozhian Cossacks from it. This prompted the unregistered Cossacks of the Bazavluk Sich to rise against Chorny in the Fedorovych Uprising. The rebels captured him before a Cossack military tribunal in Borovytsi (now a village in Cherkasy Raion, Cherkasy Oblast; until 2020 in Chyhyryn Raion). He was found guilty of supporting Polish policies and the Union of Brest, which many traditionally Orthodox Ukrainians regarded as an attempt at Catholicisation. Chorny was sentenced to death by beheading.
