= Henryk Poddębski =

Polish photographer and local historian (1890–1945)

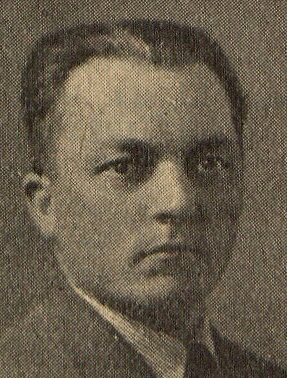
- Portrait of Poddębski, 1939. From the collections of the National Library of Poland
- Born: 21 November 1890; Chrząstów, Piotrków Governorate, Congress Poland
- Died: 4 March 1945 (aged 54); Vaihingen an der Enz concentration camp, Gau Württemberg-Hohenzollern, Nazi Germany
- Education: Warsaw Trade School of the Merchants' Association
- Occupations: Photographer, local historian
- Awards: Officer's Cross of the Order of Polonia Restituta; Bronze Cross of Merit

Henryk Poddębski (21 November 1890 – 4 March 1945) was a Polish photographer, local historian. Member of the Polish Local History Union (1911). Secretary of the Photographic Commission of the Polish Local History Union.

== Biography ==
Born 21 November 1890 in Chrząstów (since 1959 part of Koniecpol) to Jan and Maria from Bąbczyński, he lived in Warsaw from 1900. He graduated from the Warsaw Trade School of the Merchants' Association. He started taking photographs in 1911. He was fond of documentary, landscape, local history and landscape photography. In 1914–1939, he took part in more than 10 local history expeditions, excursion photo trips (including with Mieczysław Orłowicz), during which he photographed the landscapes and life of Galicia, the Carpathians, Kuyavia, Masuria, Subcarpathia, Upper Silesia, Great Poland, Lithuania, Podillia, and Volyn. He was one of the Polish innovators of color photography before the World War II.

From 1917, Poddębski worked as the secretary of the Photographic Commission of the Polish Local History Union. In 1920, he served as a volunteer in the Polish army. From 1925, he worked in his own photo studio on Marszałkowska Street in Warsaw, specializing in local history photography. Poddębski's works were presented at many photo exhibitions: personal and collective, in Poland and abroad (including Lviv). His photographs have been repeatedly honored with prizes and awards at post-competition exhibitions at the national and international levels. Poddębski's photo archive consists of more than 22,000 photos.

Poddębski was deported by the Germans from Warsaw on 12 September 1944, during the Warsaw Uprising, and died in the Nazi concentration camp in Vaihingen an der Enz. His symbolic grave is located in the Powązki Cemetery in Warsaw (quarters 70–3–3,4). Photographs of Henryk Poddębski are in the collections of (among others) the Museum of Warsaw, the National Digital Archives, the National Library of Poland, the Museum of the City of Gdynia and the Institute of Art of the Polish Academy of Sciences.

== Awards ==
- Officer's Cross of the Order of Polonia Restituta (posthumously, 2019).
- Bronze Cross of Merit (1938).
