= Koniecpol =

Town in Silesian Voivodeship, Poland

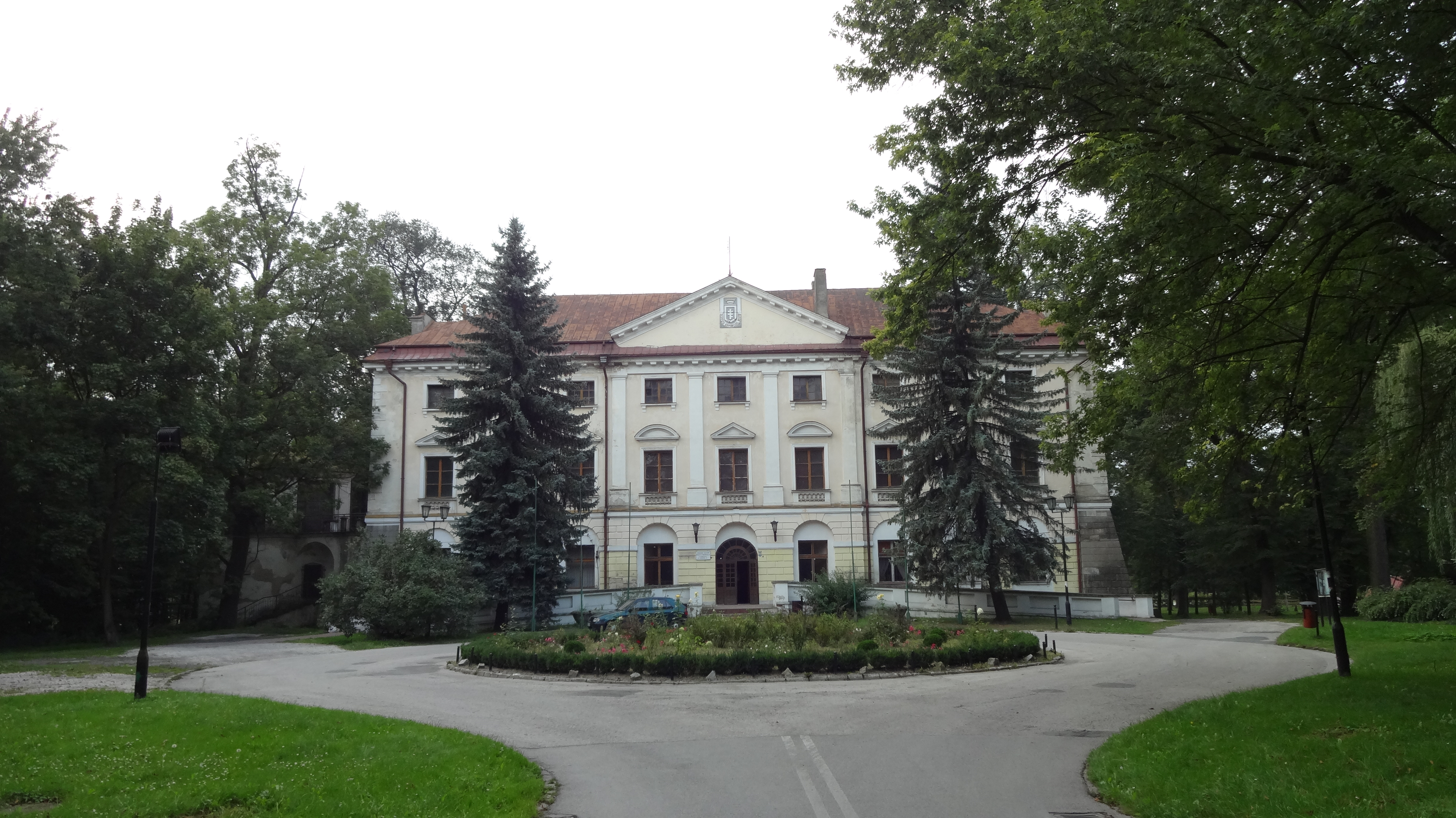
- Potocki Palace

- Flag Coat of arms

- Location within Poland
- Coordinates: 50°47′N 19°41′E
- Country: Poland
- Voivodeship: Silesian
- County: Częstochowa
- Gmina: Koniecpol
- Town rights: 1443

Area
  - Total: 36.52 km^{2} (14.10 sq mi)

Population (2019-06-30)
  - Total: 5,910
  - Density: 162/km^{2} (419/sq mi)
- Time zone: UTC+1 (CET)
  - Summer (DST): UTC+2 (CEST)
- Postal code: 42-230
- Vehicle registration: SCZ
- Climate: Dfb
- Website: www.koniecpol.pl

Koniecpol [kɔˈɲɛt͡spɔl] is a town in Częstochowa County, Silesian Voivodeship, in southern Poland, with 5,910 inhabitants (2019). It is situated on the Pilica River, in the historic Sieradz Land.

== History ==
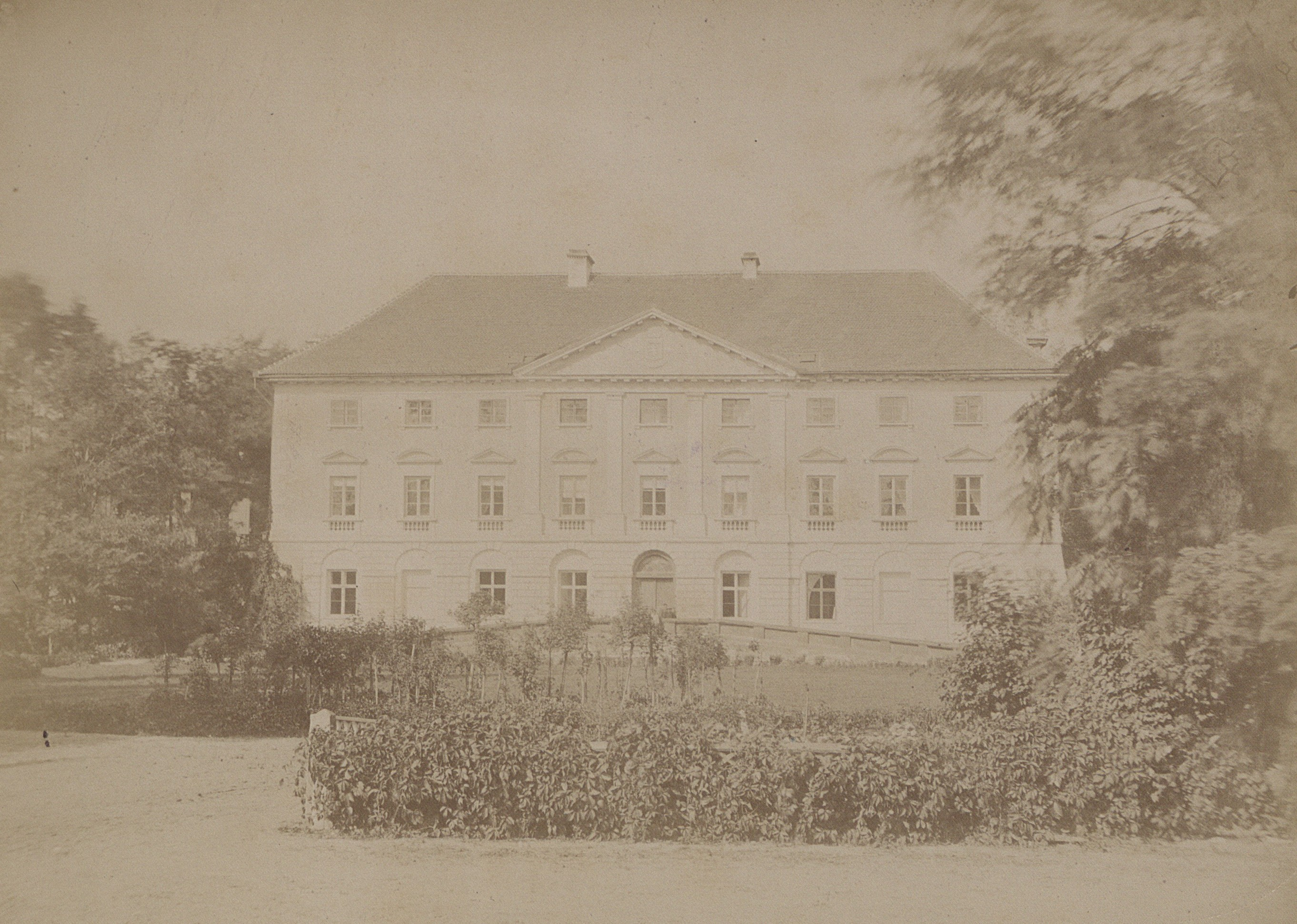
Palace in 1875

It was granted town rights by King Władysław III of Poland in 1443. Koniecpol, also known as Nowopole, was a private town, administratively located in the Radomsko County in the Sieradz Voivodeship in the Greater Poland Province of the Kingdom of Poland. It was the seat of the Koniecpolski magnate family, and later it passed to the Czapski and Potocki families. In the 16th century, King Sigismund II Augustus established four annual fairs. In the 17th century, Hetman Stanisław Koniecpolski built the landmark Baroque Holy Trinity church.

Following the German-Soviet invasion of Poland, which started World War II in September 1939, it was occupied by Germany until 1945. The German occupiers operated a camp for Sinti and Romani people in the town. Three local Polish policemen were murdered by the Russians in the Katyn massacre in 1940. The Polish resistance was present in Koniecpol and its surroundings, and activities included blowing up German train convoys and secret theater performances.

== Twin towns – sister cities ==
See twin towns of Gmina Koniecpol.

== Notable residents ==
- Henryk Poddębski (1890–1945), Polish photographer and local historian
