= Aleksander Koniecpolski (1555–1609) =

Polish politician

- Coat of arms: Pobóg
- Born: 1555
- Died: 1609 (aged 53–54)
- Family: Koniecpolski
- Wife: Anna Sroczycka
- Issue: Stanisław Koniecpolski; Krzysztof Koniecpolski; Remigiush Koniecpolski; Jan Koniecpolski; Przedbor Koniecpolski
- Father: Stanisław Przedbór Koniecpolski
- Mother: Elżbieta Ligozianka

Aleksander Koniecpolski (1555–1609) was a voivode (palatine) of Sieradz, a staunch supporter of king Sigismund III Vasa of the House of Vasa.

He was the son of Stanisław Przedbór Koniecpolski and Elżbieta Ligzianka (relative of hetman Jan Tarnowski). His wife was Anna Sroczycka, daughter of Stanisław Sroczycki, voivode of Kamieniec. This marriage brought into the Koniecpolscy family large estates at Podolia.

He had six children:

- Stanisław Koniecpolski, the great and famous hetman, voivode of Sandomierz and semi-official 'viceroy of Ukraine'
- Krzysztof Koniecpolski (chorąży koronny, voivode of Belz from 1641)
- Remigiusz Koniecpolski, bishop of Chełm (died in 1640)
- Jan Koniecpolski (castellan and voivode of Sieradz)
- Przedbor Koniecpolski (died in 1611)
- Anna Aleksandra Koniecpolska (died in 1651), married to Kasper Doenhoff (1588–1645). She was a great-grandmother of king Stanisław Leszczyński of Poland.
