= Ivan Sulyma =

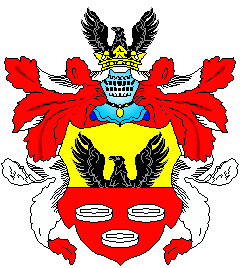
The Coat of Arms of the Sulyma family

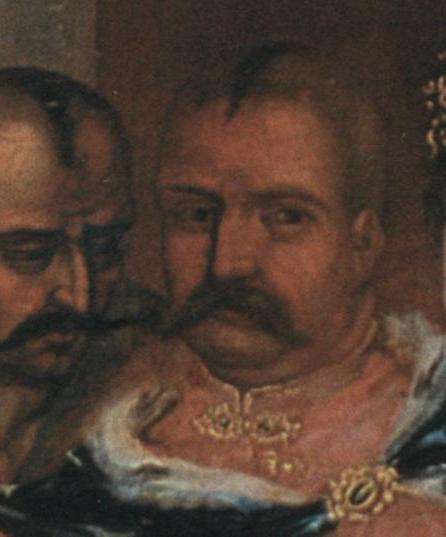
Ivan Sulyma

Ivan Sulyma (Polish: Iwan Sulima, Ukrainian: Іван Михайлович Сулима, romanized: Ivan Mykhailovych Sulyma) was a Senior of Registered Cossacks in 1628–29 and a Kosh Otaman in 1630–1635.

== Life and death ==
Son of Mykhailo Sulyma, Ivan came from a petty noble (szlachta) family. He was born in Rohoshchi (next to Chernihiv). He served as an estate overseer for Stanisław Żółkiewski and later the family of Daniłowicze who inherited his lands; for that service in 1620 he was awarded three villages: Sulimówka, Kuczakiw and Lebedyn. All the villages today belong to the Boryspil Raion, Kyiv Oblast. His sons included Stepan (died 1659), a captain of Boryspil company, and Fedir (died 1691), a colonel of Pereiaslav regiment.

He became popular among the unregistered Cossacks, leading them on campaigns to plunder Crimea and other Ottoman vassal territories. For organizing a revolt on an Ottoman slave galley and freeing Christian slaves he received a medal from Pope Paul V himself. Eventually, Sulyma reached the rank of the hetman, which he held from 1628 to 1629 and 1630 to 1635.

In 1635, after returning from an expedition to Black Sea against the Ottomans, he decided to rebel against the Polish–Lithuanian Commonwealth, which at that time controlled most of the Cossack territories, and whose nobility was trying to turn militant Cossacks into serfs. Ivan Sulyma took part in numerous campaigns of Sagaidachny against Tatars and Turks. In particular, it was the famous capture of Kafa (modern Theodosia), the main center of the slave trade on the Black Sea, Trapezont, Izmail, and also two attacks on Tsaregrad. On the night of 3 to 4 August 1635 he took the newly constructed Kodak fortress by surprise, burning it and executing its crew of about 200 people under Jean Marion. Soon afterwards however his forces were defeated by the army of hetman Stanisław Koniecpolski and Sulyma was turned over to the Commonwealth by Cossack elders or starshina. Together with several other leaders of his rebellion, Hetman Sulyma was executed in Warsaw on 12 December 1635. At first, the Polish King Władysław IV Waza, known for his friendly attitude towards the Cossacks, was hesitant to execute Sulyma, especially since he was a person upon whom the Pope himself bestowed his medal. However, pressured by the nobility who wanted to show that no rebellions against the 'established order' would be tolerated, the order for an execution was given; after being tortured, Sulyma was cut to pieces and his body parts were hung on the city walls of Warsaw.

== See also ==
- Hetman of Zaporizhian Cossacks
