= Aleksander Koniecpolski (1620–1659) =

Polish noble

- Coat of arms: Póbog Pobóg
- Born: 1620; Podhorce
- Died: March 30, 1659 (aged 38–39); Podhorce
- Family: Koniecpolski
- Wife: Joanna Barbara Zamoyska
- Issue: Stanisław Koniecpolski
- Father: Stanisław Koniecpolski
- Mother: Krystyna Lubomirska

Prince Aleksander Koniecpolski (1620–1659) was a Polish nobleman. He became the Grand Standard-Bearer of the Crown in 1641, the Palatine of Sandomierz Voivodeship in 1656, and the Starost of Perejasław, Korsun, Płoskirow and Dolina. He was the son of the famous hetman Stanisław Koniecpolski.

During the Chmielnicki Uprising, he was elected as one of the Regimentarz of the pospolite ruszenie and took part on the losing side of the Battle of Pyliavtsi in 1648.
