= Treaty of Pereiaslav (1630) =

1630 treaty between Poland and Cossacks

Treaty of Pereiaslav was an agreement concluded on 8 June 1630 (O.S. 29 May 1630) between the Polish-Lithuanian Commonwealth, represented by Field Hetman Stanisław Koniecpolski, and several leaders of the rebellious Cossack forces including hetman Anton Konashevych-But, ending the Fedorovych Uprising. It is not related to the 1654 Pereiaslav Agreement between the Cossack Hetmanate and the Tsardom of Russia.

Under the treaty, the Cossacks agreed to stop raiding Ottoman territories, return artillery pieces captured from the Poles, and removing Fedorovych from his position of authority among the Cossacks. The number of registered Cossacks was increased from 6,000 to 8,000.

Taras Fedorovych, who initially led the uprising, but was apparently overthrown as hetman of the unregistered Cossacks in May 1630 by Konashevych-But, was not present at the treaty negotiations. Fedorovych criticized the treaty, and the treaty failed to appease Zaporozhian Cossacks, who continued their raids against the Turks.

== See also ==
- Registered Cossacks
- Treaty of Kurukove (1625)
- Pereiaslav Agreement (1654)
- Pereiaslav Articles of 1659

== Bibliography ==
- Vortman, D. Ya. (2021) [2003]. "Федорович Тарас" [Taras Fedorovych]. Encyclopedia of History of Ukraine (in Ukrainian). Vol. 1. Kyiv: Institute of History of Ukraine. Archived from the original on 11 December 2025.
