= Battle of Kurukov Lake (1625) =

Battle during the Zhmaylo uprising

- Part of Zhmaylo uprising
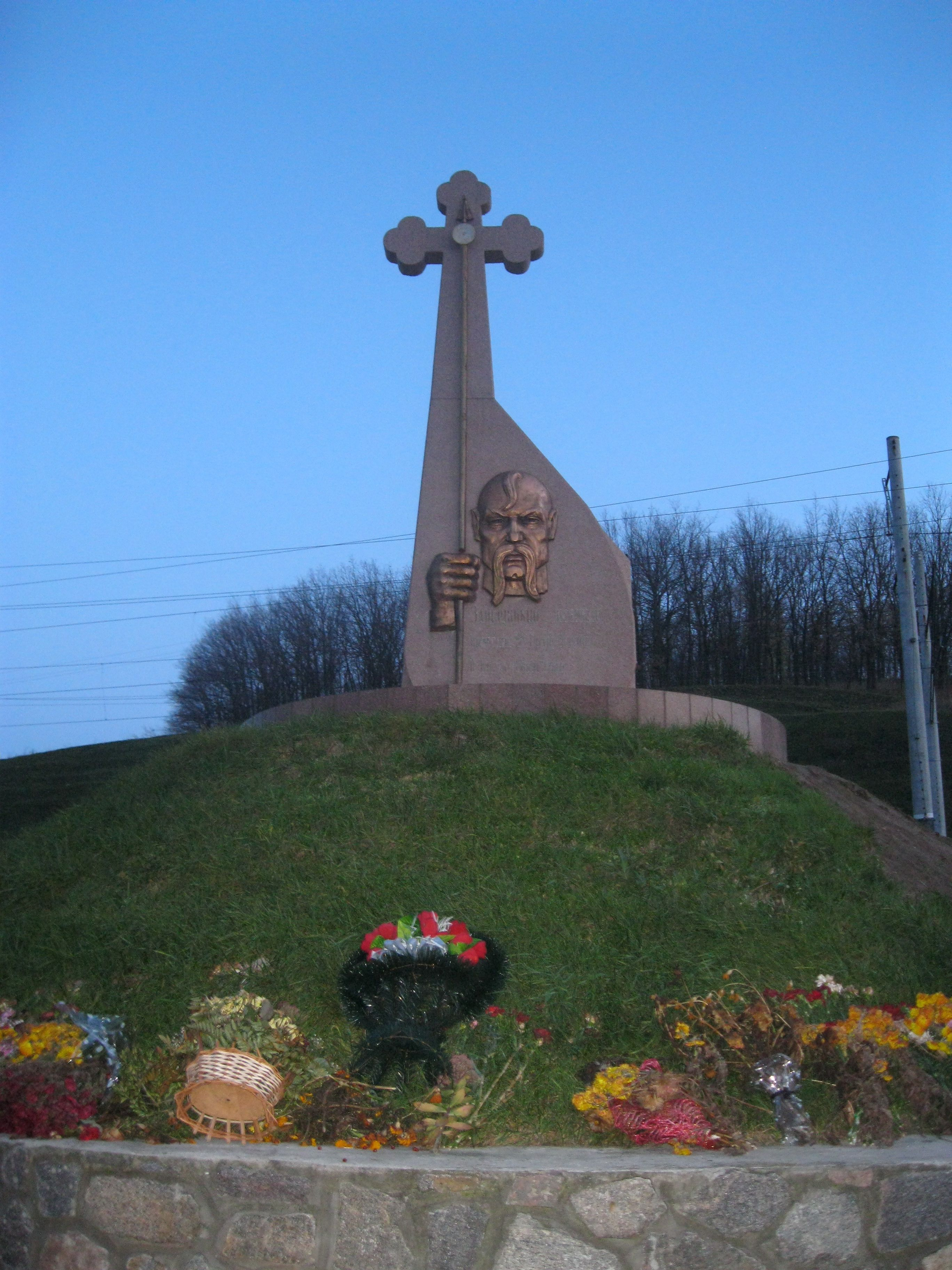
- Memorial to the Battle
Location	Near Kurukov Lake, Polish-Lithuanian Commonwealth (present-day Ukraine)
Result	See § Aftermarh

Belligerents
Polish-Lithuanian Commonwealth	Zaporozhian Cossacks

Commanders and leaders
Stanisław Koniecpolski; Stanisław Rewera Potocki; Tomasz Zamoyski	Marko Zhmaylo; Olifer Golub

Strength
30,000	10,000–20,000

The Battle of Kurukov Lake (1625) was a clash between the armies of the Polish-Lithuanian Commonwealth under Hetman Stanisław Koniecpolski and the Zaporozhian Cossack forces led by Marek Zhmaylo. The battle took place in what is now Ukraine, near Kremenchuk. The conflict was part of Zhmaylo uprising.

== Background ==
In 1625, the Cossacks, under the command of Hetman Marek Zhmaylo and Olifer Golub, organised an uprising against Polish rule. The City Cossacks and the Zaporozhians planned to unite their forces and make Left-Bank Ukraine their base of operations. After a series of clashes and unsuccessful negotiations, both sides concentrated their forces in the Kurukov (now Kremenchuk) area.

== Battle ==
At the end of October 1625, the Poles, led by Hetman Stanisław Koniecpolski, decided to launch a decisive attack on the Cossack camp at Kurukov. Motivated by their earlier successes, the Poles made preparations for the assault, although their actions were rather hasty and not fully thought out. The Cossacks, anticipating a possible attack, skilfully chose the place of defence. They camped in swampy and wooded terrain, which significantly hampered the movement of the Polish cavalry and limited its effectiveness. In addition, the Cossacks deployed part of their forces in concealment in the bushes by the lake, which enabled them to conduct effective operations from ambush.

On 31 October 1625, the Poles launched an assault. Initially, attempts to capture the camp were unsuccessful, as the swampy terrain effectively neutralised cavalry attacks. Cossacks conducting artillery and rifle fire from the camp made it much more difficult for the Poles to take the positions. The first attempt at a mass attack, led by Tomasz Zamoyski, almost ended tragically. Zamoyski was hit by a bullet, but his armour saved his life. At the same time, the German infantry, led by the Maltese cavalryman Judycki, was repulsed and Judycki himself was wounded. Despite advanced operations, the Poles were unable to break through the Cossack defence, which was well organised and effective.

== Aftermath ==
After the final attack, the negotiations began, which on 3 November, ended with the signing of a peace agreement on 6 November. The Cossacks pledged allegiance to the Commonwealth, to refrain from hostilities without the king's consent, and to renounce naval activities. The agreement provided for the maintenance of 6,000 Cossack registers and the granting of special privileges for Cossack officers.
