= Kriukivskyi District =

City district of Kremenchuk, Ukraine

Kriukivskyi District Крюківський район
- Urban district
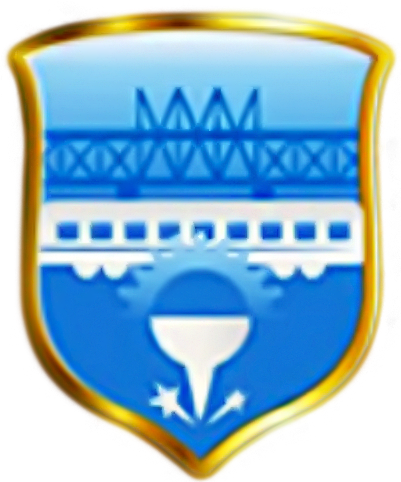
- Coat of arms
- Interactive map of Kriukivskyi District
- Coordinates: 49°04′00″N 33°27′11″E
- Country: Ukraine
- City: Kremenchuk
- Established: 1975

Area
  - Total: 46.75 km^{2} (18.05 sq mi)

Population
  - Total: 75,578
  - Density: 1,617/km^{2} (4,187/sq mi)
- Time zone: UTC+2 (EET)
  - Summer (DST): UTC+3 (EEST)

The Kriukivskyi District (Ukrainian: Крюківський район, romanized: Kriukivs'kyi raion) is one of two administrative urban districts (raions) of the city of Kremenchuk, located in central Ukraine.

== Geography ==
The district is located near the former site of Lake Kurukove on the right bank of the Dnieper, and is separated by the river from the rest of Kremenchuk. Historically, it used to be a separate city known as Kriukiv.

== History ==
Treaty of Kurukove was signed in the area on 5 November 1625 between the Polish government and Cossacks.

== Economy ==
Kriukiv Railway Car Building Works is located in the district.

== Gallery ==
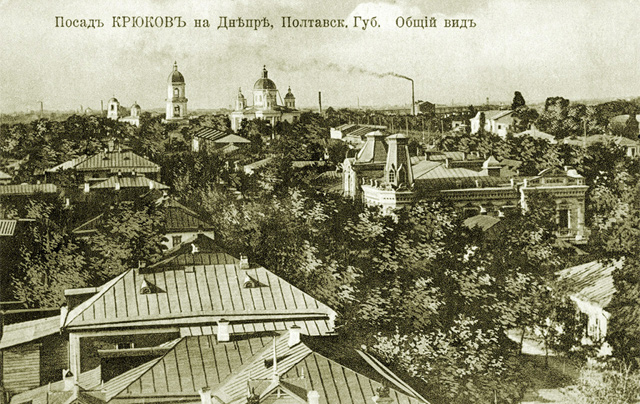
Skyline of Kriukiv during the early 1900s

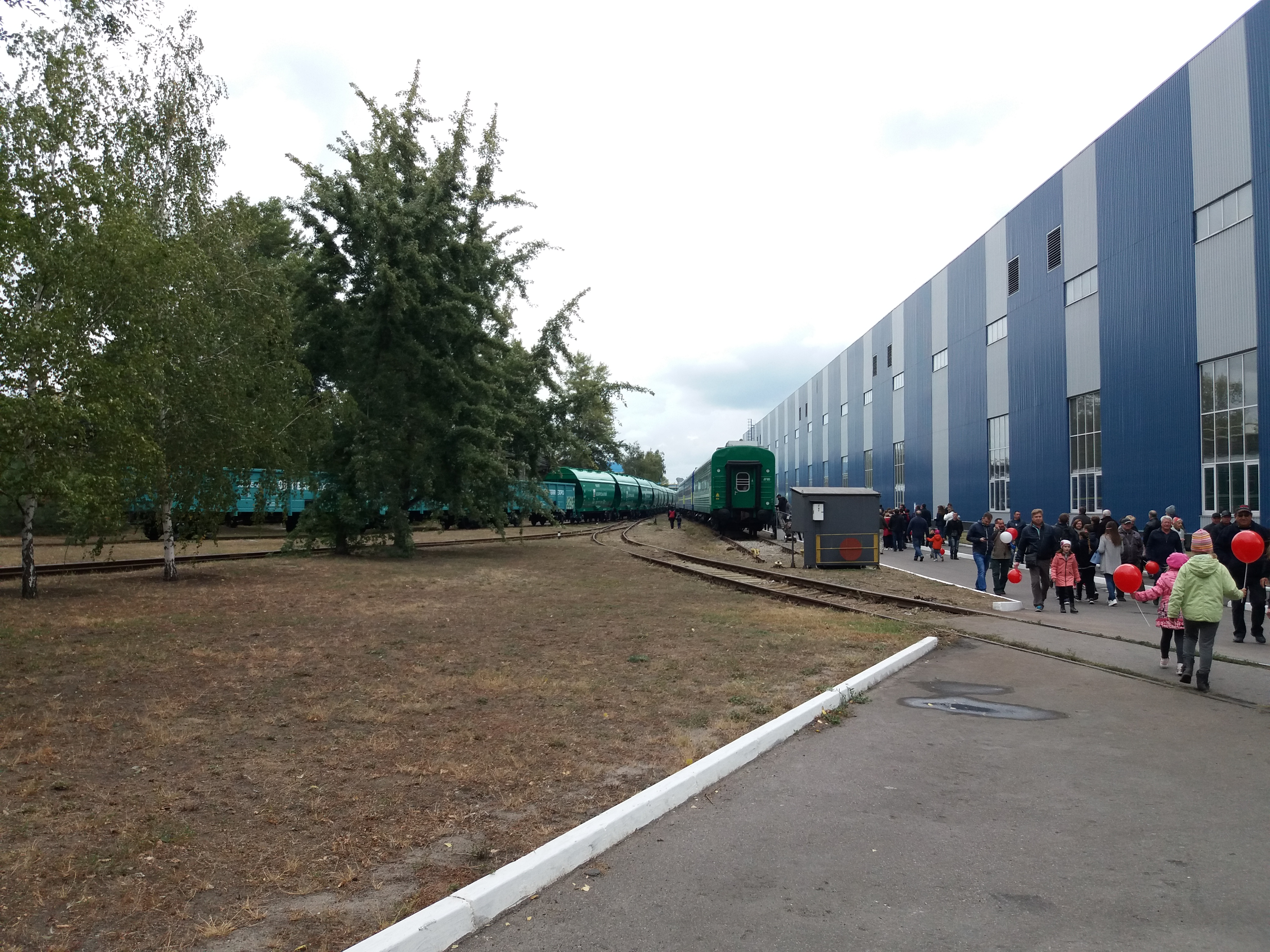
Kriukiv Car Building Works

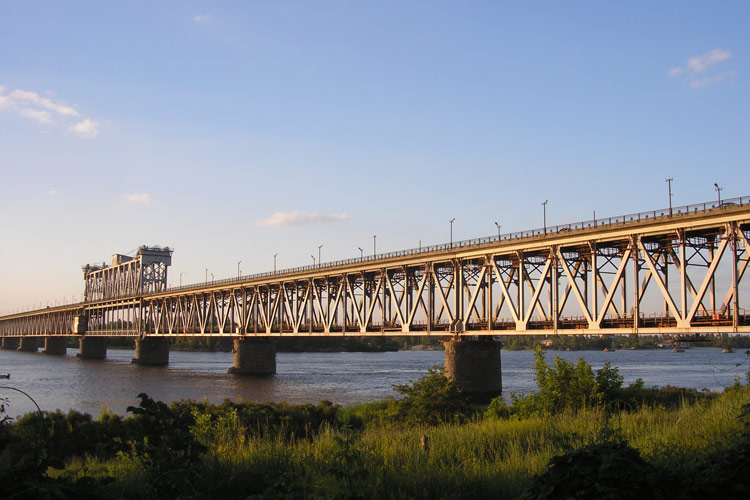
Kriukiv Bridge connecting the district with downtown Kremenchuk
