= Kulchytskyi =

Kulchytskyi (Ukrainian: Кульчицький, BGN/PCGN 1965 Kul’chyts’kyy) is a Ukrainian toponymic surname meaning "someone from Kulchytsi". Kulchitsky (Кульчицкий, Кульчитский) is a Russian version, Kulczycki is a Polish version Kulchytski is Belarusian.

- Ihor Kulchytskyi (born 1941), Ukrainian soviet footballer
- Lev Kulchitsky (1813-1873, rear admiral of the Imperial Russian Navy and member of the Imperial Admiralty Council
- Oleksandr Kulschytskyi (1895–1980), Ukrainian psychologist and philosopher
- Serhii Kulchytskyi
- Stanislav Kulchitskyi (born 1937), Ukrainian historian
- Stsyafan Kulchytski (1879–1937), Belarusian religious and public figure, archpriest of the Minsk diocese
- Yuriy-Frants Kulchytsky (pol. Jerzy Franciszek Kulczycki, 1640–1694), Cossack and allegedly the first café owner
