= Hryhoriy Omelchenko =

Ukrainian politician

- Григорій Омельченко
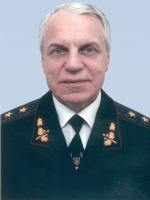

People's Deputy of Ukraine
- In office 11 May 1994 – 12 December 2012
- Preceded by: Mykola Zaludyak (1994); Constituency established (1998)
- Succeeded by: Constituency abolished (1998); Andriy Verevskyi (2002)
- Constituency: Poltava Oblast, Kriukivskyi (1994–1998); Poltava Oblast, No. 146 (1998–2002); Yulia Tymoshenko Bloc, No. 3 (2002–2006); Yulia Tymoshenko Bloc, No. 7 (2006–2012)

Personal details
- Born: 4 May 1951 (age 75) Novoselytsia, Ukrainian SSR, Soviet Union (now Ukraine)
- Party: Our Ukraine (since 2012)
- Other political affiliations: Ukrainian Republican Party (c. 1999-2005); Batkivshchyna (c. 2007–2009)
- Education: Taras Shevchenko National University of Kyiv

Military service
- Allegiance: Ukraine
- Branch/service: Security Service of Ukraine

Hryhoriy Omelianovych Omelchenko (Ukrainian: Григорій Омелянович Омельченко; born 4 May 1951) is a Ukrainian politician who served as a People's Deputy of Ukraine from 1994 to 2012, representing Poltava Oblast until 2002 and later being elected from the proportional list of the Yulia Tymoshenko Bloc. He was previously an officer of the Security Service of Ukraine. As a People's Deputy, Omelchenko was involved in investigating several political scandals in Ukraine during the 2000s, including the murder of Georgiy Gongadze, allegations of arms trafficking under President Leonid Kuchma and the Artek child rape scandal.

== Early life and career ==
Hryhoriy Omelianovych Omelchenko was born 4 May 1951 in Novoselytsia, in Ukraine's central Poltava Oblast under the Soviet Union. He studied at the faculty of law at Taras Shevchenko National University of Kyiv, graduating in 1976. Prior to taking office, Omelchenko served as an officer in the Security Service of Ukraine (SBU).

== Political career ==
Omelchenko was first elected to the Verkhovna Rada (parliament of Ukraine) in the 1994 Ukrainian parliamentary election, representing the city of Kremenchuk's Kriukivskyi District. He was subsequently re-elected from Ukraine's 146th electoral district in 1998 as an independent, though he was deputy chairman of the Ukrainian Republican Party from December 1999 to November 2005. He was re-elected in the 2002 Ukrainian parliamentary election, this time as the third candidate on the proportional list of the Yulia Tymoshenko Bloc.

Omelchenko was once again elected in the 2006 Ukrainian parliamentary election, this time as the candidate on the proportional list of the Yulia Tymoshenko Bloc. By this time, he was no longer a member of the Republican Party. At some time between the 2006 and 2007 parliamentary elections he joined the Batkivshchyna party.

Omelchenko was a critic of corruption and the government of Leonid Kuchma. He accused Kuchma of involvement in trafficking weapons to China, North Korea and Iran, additionally claiming that Kuchma had planned to assassinate him. Omelchenko headed the parliamentary investigation on the murder of Georgiy Gongadze.

From 2006 to 2010 Omelchenko was a member of the Parliamentary Assembly of the Council of Europe. He was awarded the title of Hero of Ukraine by President Viktor Yushchenko in 2010.

Omelchenko was expelled from the Yulia Tymoshenko Bloc in October 2009. Serhiy Mishchenko, a fellow member of the alliance, claimed that Omelchenko had been removed due to having left the Batkivshchyna party, but BBC News Ukrainian alleged that it had come after he issued a parliamentary request to President Yushchenko on details regarding the Artek affair, an incident in which three deputies from the Yulia Tymoshenko Bloc were accused of child rape. The mother of the child allegedly raped by the deputies had previously issued an appeal to Omelchenko asking him to raise the issue.

Omelchenko has been a member of the Our Ukraine party since 2012.

In March 2026, Omelchenko allegedly threatened Prime Minister of Hungary, Viktor Orbán. However, according to cybersecurity expert Ferenc Frész, the audio was likely generated with AI tools and imposed onto footage of Omelchenko.
