= I52 =

I52 or I-52 may refer to:

- HMS Salisbury (I52), a destroyer in service with the Royal Navy from 1940 to 1942
- Japanese submarine I-52, several ships of the Imperial Japanese Navy
- I-52-class submarine, of the Imperial Japanese Navy
- I-52 Mine layer vehicle, from Ukraine
