= The Blue Bottle Coffee House =

Historical coffee house in Vienna, Austria

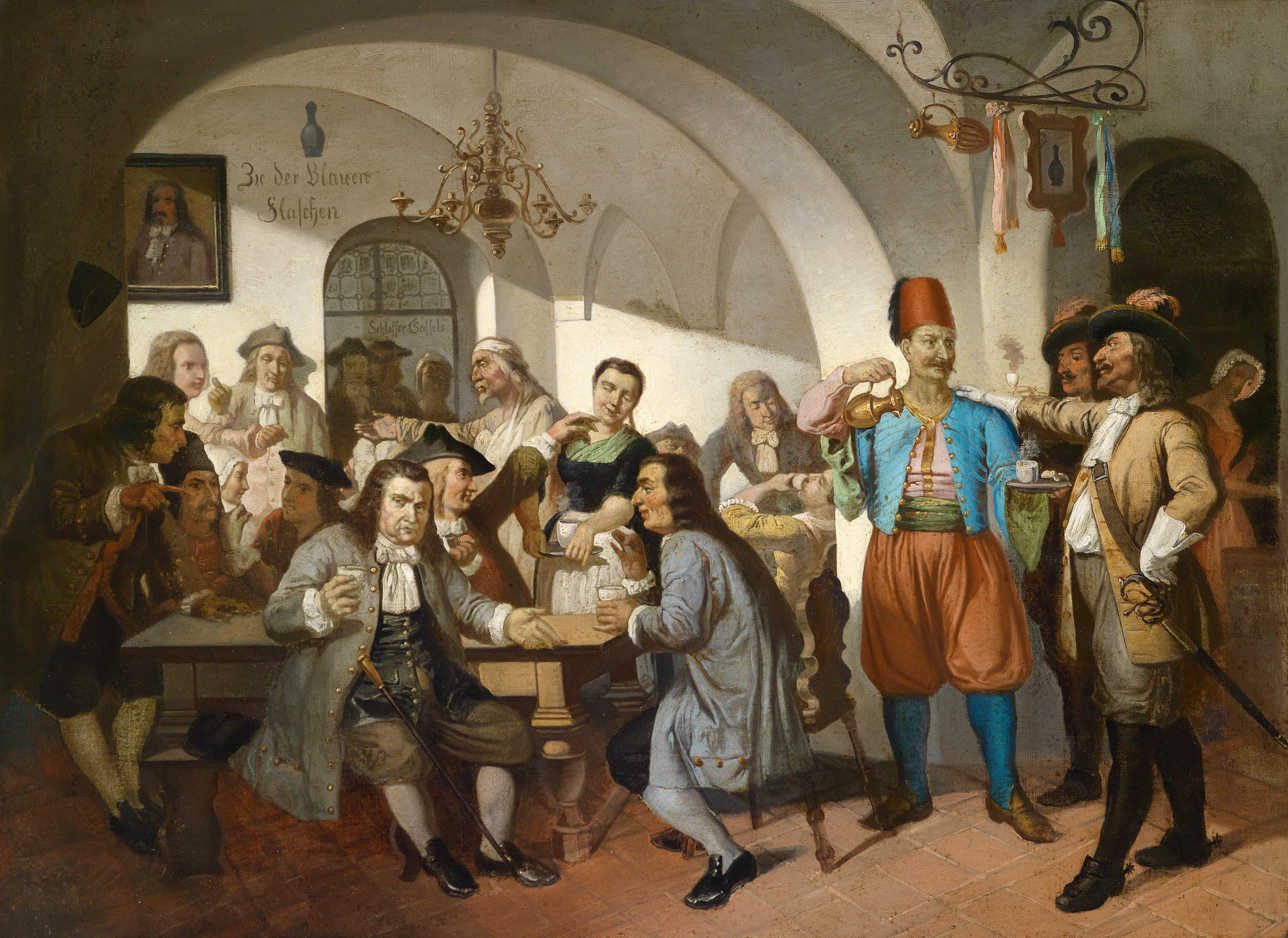
Zu den blauen Flaschen, (Schlossergassl) coffee house scene

Hof zur Blauen Flasche (the House Under the Blue Bottle) is, according to legend, one of the first coffee houses in Vienna, Austria. It was founded in 1683 by the Ruthenian Jerzy Franciszek Kulczycki, a hero of the Battle of Vienna.

According to legend, the Blue Bottle was Vienna's first-ever coffeehouse. The story goes that Kulczycki was the only person to recognize that the sacks of dark-brown beans left behind by the invading Ottoman Turks were coffee beans, and he used these spoils to open up a coffeehouse. However, more recent research shows that the first Viennese coffeehouse actually opened in 1685 (one year prior to the Blue Bottle), founded by Johannes Theodat (aka Johannes Diodato or Deodat and Owanes Astouatzatur). Many of the stories about Kulczycki were invented by Gottfried Uhlich in 1783.

== Cultural influence ==
Until recently, every year in October a special Kolschitzky feast was organized by the café owners of Vienna, who decorated their shop windows with Kulczycki's portrait, as noted by Polish historian and geographer Zygmunt Gloger. Kulczycki is memorialized with a statue on Vienna's Kolschitzky street, at the corner of the house Favoritenstraße 64.

In honor of the historic Vienna coffeehouse, the "Blue Bottle" name was adopted in the 21st century by the Blue Bottle Coffee Company, a coffee roaster and chain of coffee shops based in Oakland, California, US.

== See also ==
- Coffee
- List of restaurants in Vienna
