= Marko Zhmaylo =

Marko Zhmaylo-Kulchytskyi (Ukrainian: Марко Жмайло-Кульчицький; Polish: Marek Żmajło – Date of birth and death unknown) was hetman of Ukrainian Registered Cossacks and leader of the Zhmaylo Uprising against the Polish–Lithuanian Commonwealth in 1625. According to one source Zhmaylo came from the Ruthenian village of Kulchytsi, near Sambir, Lviv region.

In September 1625 Zhmaylo fought against 8,000 men of the Polish army near Lake Kurukove (modern-day Kremenchuk), but had to surrender to the forces of Hetman Stanisław Koniecpolski after an unsuccessful battle against him. By the end of that year, he was deprived of his title as hetman of the Cossacks for opposing to the negotiations with the Poles, and therefore replaced by Hetman Mykhailo Doroshenko who signed the Treaty of Kurukove with the Poles on 5 November 1625.
