= DPKr-3 Diesel Multiple Unit =

Ukrainian regional diesel multiple unit

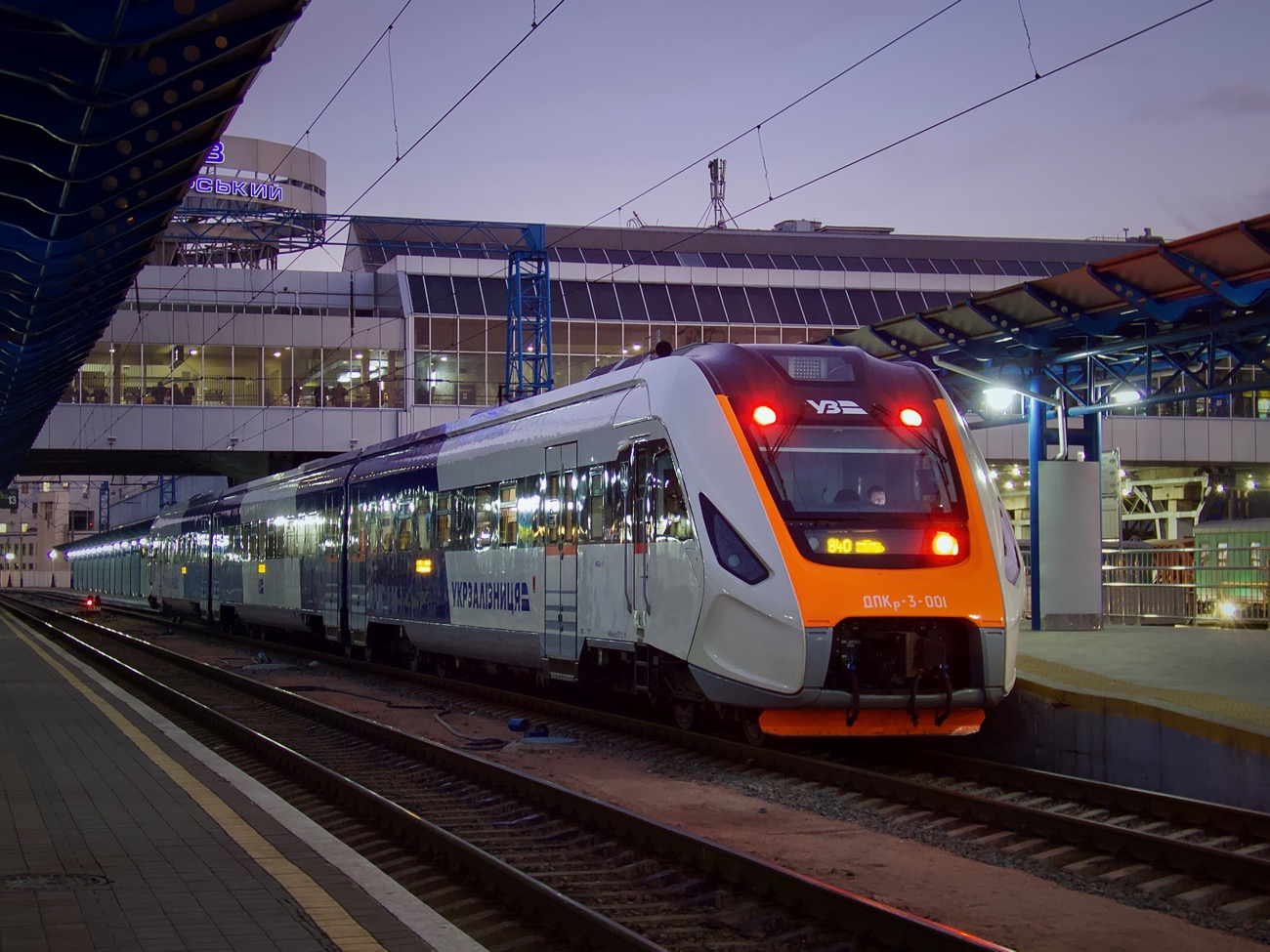
A DPKr-3 unit at Kyiv-Pasazhyrskyi railway station

DPKr-3 (Dyzel'-Pоyizd Kryukovskyi, Type 3) is a Ukrainian diesel-powered regional train manufactured by the Kryukiv Railway Car Building Works. The first unit, built in 2019, ran between Kyiv and Boryspil Airport on the Kyiv-Boryspil Express airport rail link until September 2020, after which it became an express service on the Smila - Cherkasy line. The second and third unit was built in 2021 and commissioned in October. The fourth is going through testing since the 12 of November.

== Technical characteristics ==
=== Engine ===
The regional diesel train DPKr-3, like its predecessor, the DPKr-2, has three cars. The cars on either end are motorized, containing 588 kW engines.

The main motor cars are equipped with a modular diesel-hydraulic Voith RailPack 600 DH engine, located in the cars' underbody space. It consists of a jointly-developed Voith V2862T3, a MAN Truck & Bus engine for use on diesel train cars, and Voith T212bre hydrodynamic transmission, as well as an electric generator to power the train's electrical systems. The total length and width of the installation is 3707 × 2800 mm.

The V2862T3 is a four-stroke V12 engine with a cylinder camber angle of 90° (45° to vertical). The engine is equipped with a system of selective catalytic converters (SCR) and meets the IIIB environmental standard for exhaust emissions. Rated engine power - 588 kW at a speed of 1800 rpm; maximum torque - 3350 N • m at a speed of 1300-1500 rpm; working volume - 24.24 liters (12 × 2.02 liters); maximum average effective pressure - 17.4 bar; length, width and height - 1667 × 1644 × 859 mm.

The T212bre transmission transmits traction from the engine to the wheelsets of the drive cart through the turbine oil without a continuous rigid connection in traction mode and separates them when the train is parked or running without traction. It is connected to the engine by a common flange and has one torque converter and two hydrodynamic clutches, which form three circuits of oil circulation, a hydrodynamic brake (retarder), and a mechanical reverse to change the direction of movement, as well as an automatic electronic control system. Switching of steps is carried out automatically by filling one circuit of circulation with oil and emptying another. Nominal input power of hydraulic transmission - 450 kW; oil supply - 95 L, maximum torque - 1200 N • m; length, width, and height of hydraulic transmission - 1070 × 1055 × 756 mm.

The cooling unit of the engine, which in the previous diesel train was located in the undercarriage space, was moved to the roof of the main cars. This arrangement of cooling units reduces the likelihood of dust, debris, and dirt getting into the radiators, which are raised by air currents from the railway tracks during movement.

Power for the intermediate, non-motor car comes from two generators located on the main cars.

=== Interior ===
The train's predecessor, DPKr2, was developed as a suburban train, containing 283 economy-class seats with space for standing passengers. The DPKr3 contains only 170 seats but offers an increased level of comfort and a first class section.

Each car has two vestibules, between which are the seating areas. The passenger toilet / steward's compartment can be accessed from the front vestibule of the main car.

One car contains 58 economy seats in a 3 + 2 layout and a steward's compartment; the other contains 51 seats with armrests and power sockets, space for wheelchairs, and an enlarged toilet for passengers with disabilities. The seat width in the widest sections is at least 450 mm.

The intermediate car is more spacious, with 61 first class seats (featuring wider armrests and sockets with USB connectivity) in a 2 + 2 layout. Seat width in the widest section is not less than 490–500 mm. This section is also equipped with screens for entertainment.

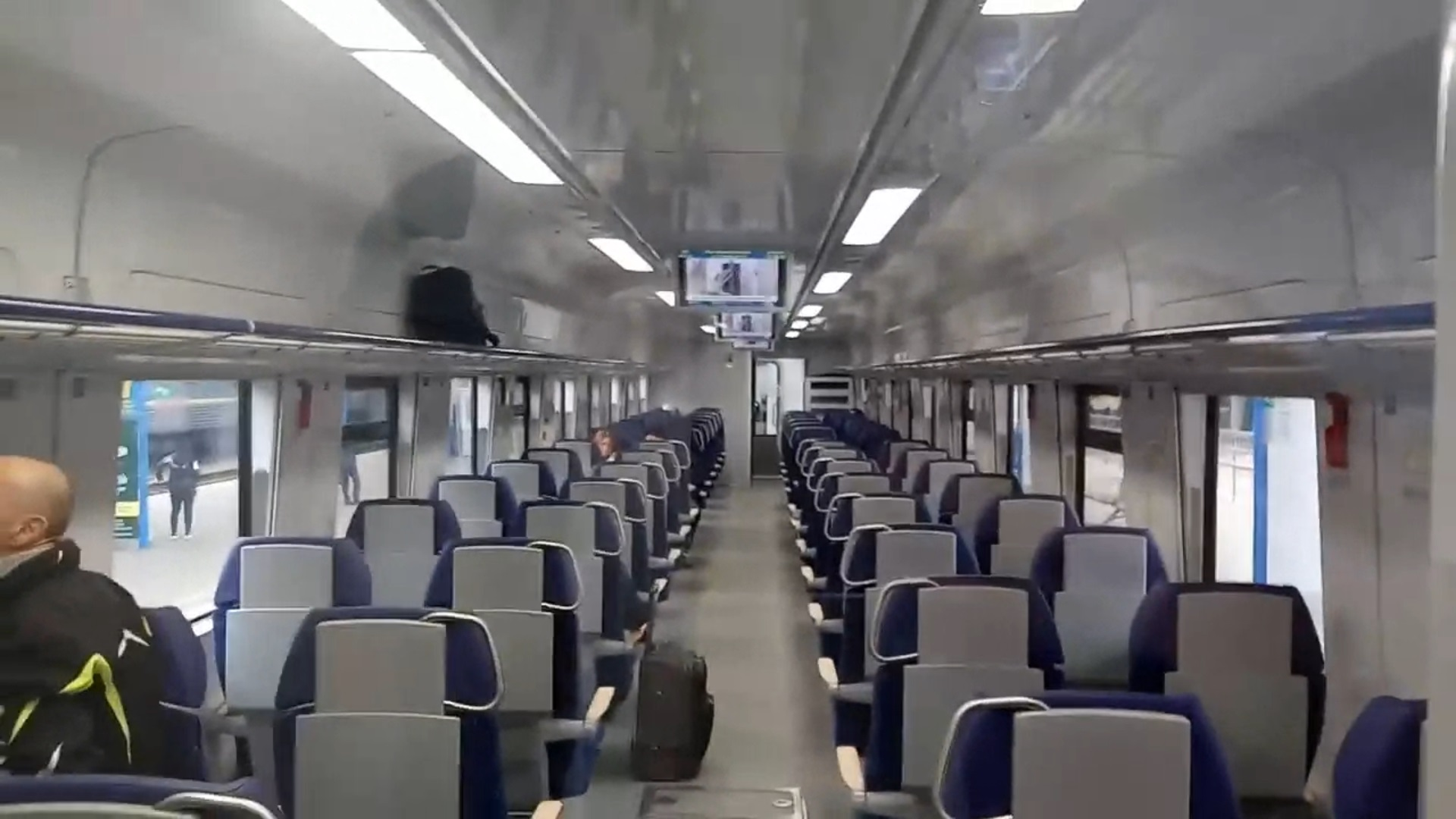
First class interior

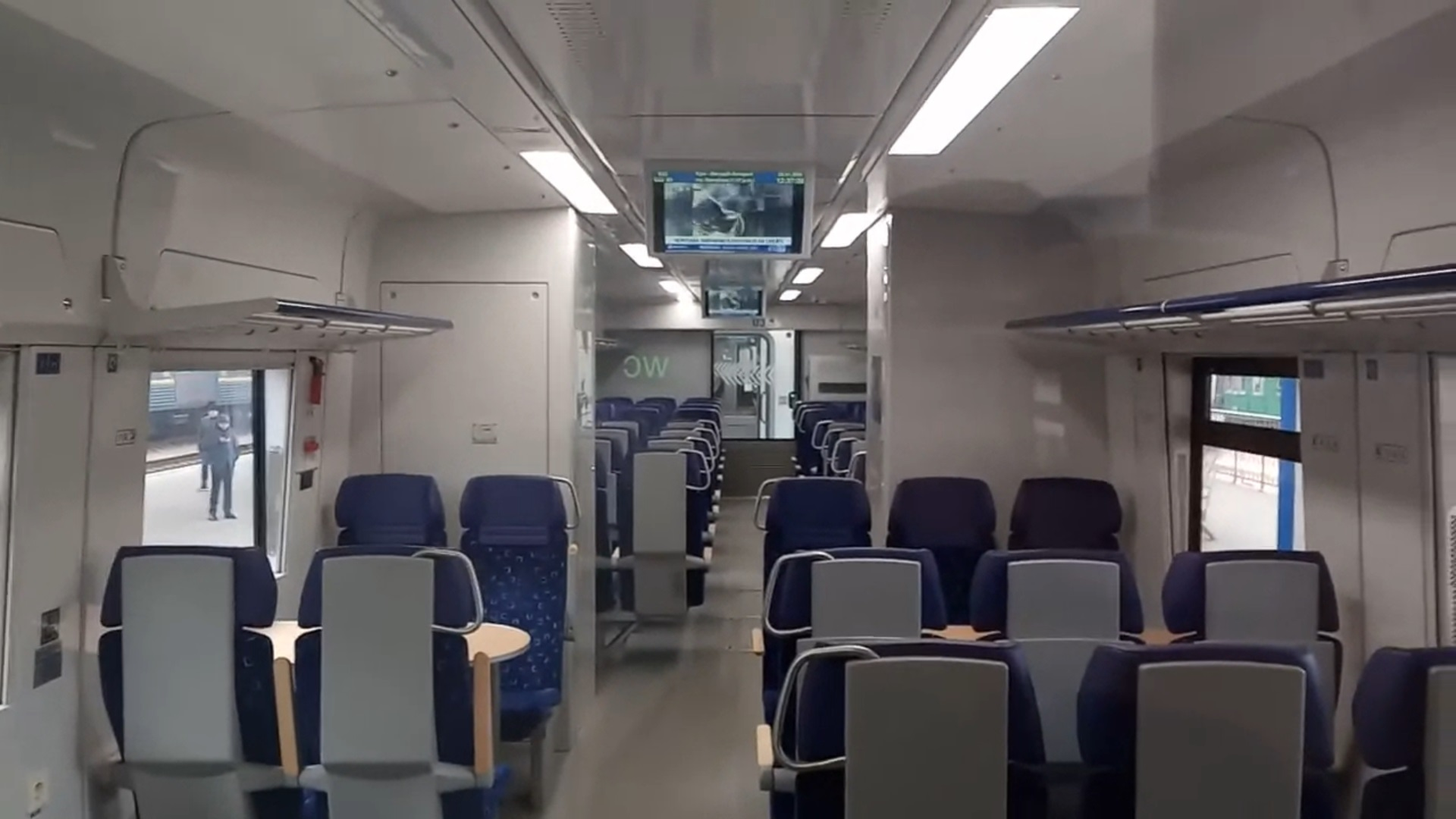
Second class interior

== Operation ==
It was expected that the new diesel multiple unit will be based at the Ternopil depot, as part of the Lviv Railway in the fall of 2019.

However, on December 27, 2019, the train was assigned to the Kyiv Boryspil Express route. Due to the sharp reduction in passenger demand due to the COVID-19 pandemic and reduced international air traffic, in March 2020 UZ temporarily suspended its operation.

On September 9, 2020, the diesel train was sent from Kyiv for a run-in at Smila (T. Shevchenko station of the Odesa Railway). On September 11, manufacturer Krukivsky Carriage Works announced results, pointing to several technical shortcomings of the Odesa Railway's TC-5 depot, selected to maintain the DPKr-3-001 train. Krukivsky announced the need to find another route and service provider. This statement was amended in their next press release, however, stating that the depot needs to be prepared for servicing the train and that on September 17 another test run was organized. It was also announced that by September 26, all the discrepancies of the depot indicated by Krukivsky specialists should be eliminated in full, and commercial transportation of passengers in this direction of traffic can begin right after.

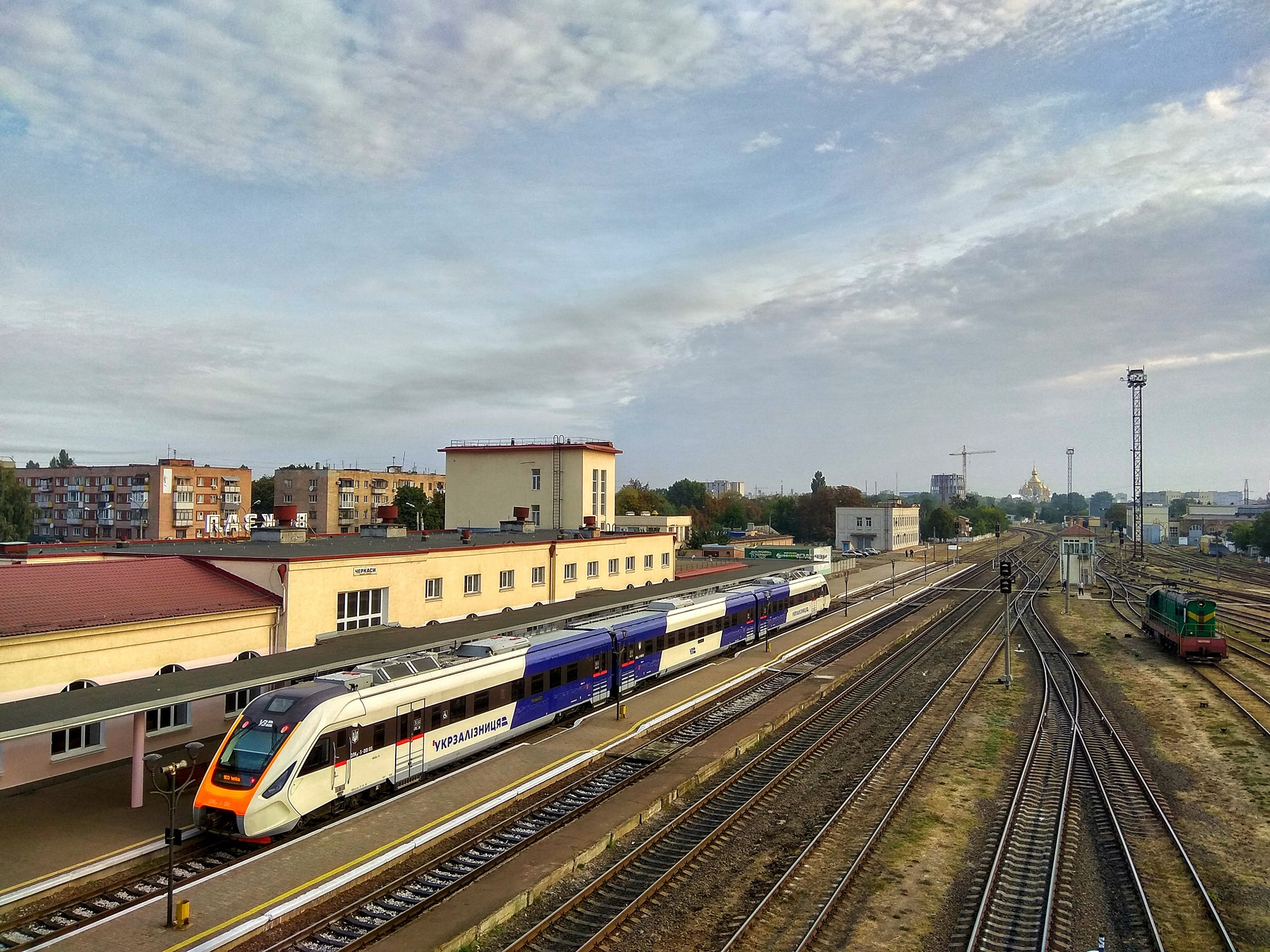
DPKr3-001 at Cherkasy station

Before entering regular operation, the train's technical condition was verified and rail workers performed maintenance. In Kyiv, the training of Odesa Railway locomotive crews was organized by Krukivsky specialists. As a result of the run-ins, the route, schedule, and other traffic parameters were worked out.

On September 23, 2020, DPKr-3 went on its first regular trip as a regional train No.805 connecting Cherkasy and T. Shevchenko stations.

From September 24, the train performs 8 daily runs between Cherkasy and Smila, numbered No.803/804, 805/806, 807/808, 809/810. Only one pair of trains, No.803/804 make an intermediate stop at Smila station, others run non-stop. The schedule allows passengers from Cherkasy to change to several passenger and high-speed trains, including Intercity, which stops at the Taras Shevchenko station and goes not only to Kyiv but also in other directions. As the new trains were classified as regional, the ticket price is higher than the suburban ones. The cost of tickets varies from ₴25 to ₴30 (second class) and ₴70-80 (first class). On weekends the price is somewhat higher.

The diesel train is serviced in the T. Shevchenko (RPD-5) motor car depot, which is structurally subordinated to the motor car depot Khrystynivka (RPC-6) of the suburban passenger transportation department of the Odesa Railway. The work of the train is monitored by the Kyiv department of Krukivsky Carriage Works.

== Sources ==
- "Пасажирський дизель-поїзд ДПКр-3". kvsz.com. Крюківський вагонобудівний завод.
- КВБЗ презентує регіональний дизель-поїзд ДПКр-3
- "Как отправляли в первый рейс в Борисполь новый дизель-поезд ДПКр-3". cfts.org.ua/. Центр транспортних стратегій. 2019-12-27.
