= Kulchytsi =

Rural locality in Lviv Oblast, Ukraine

Kulchytsi Кульчиці
- Village
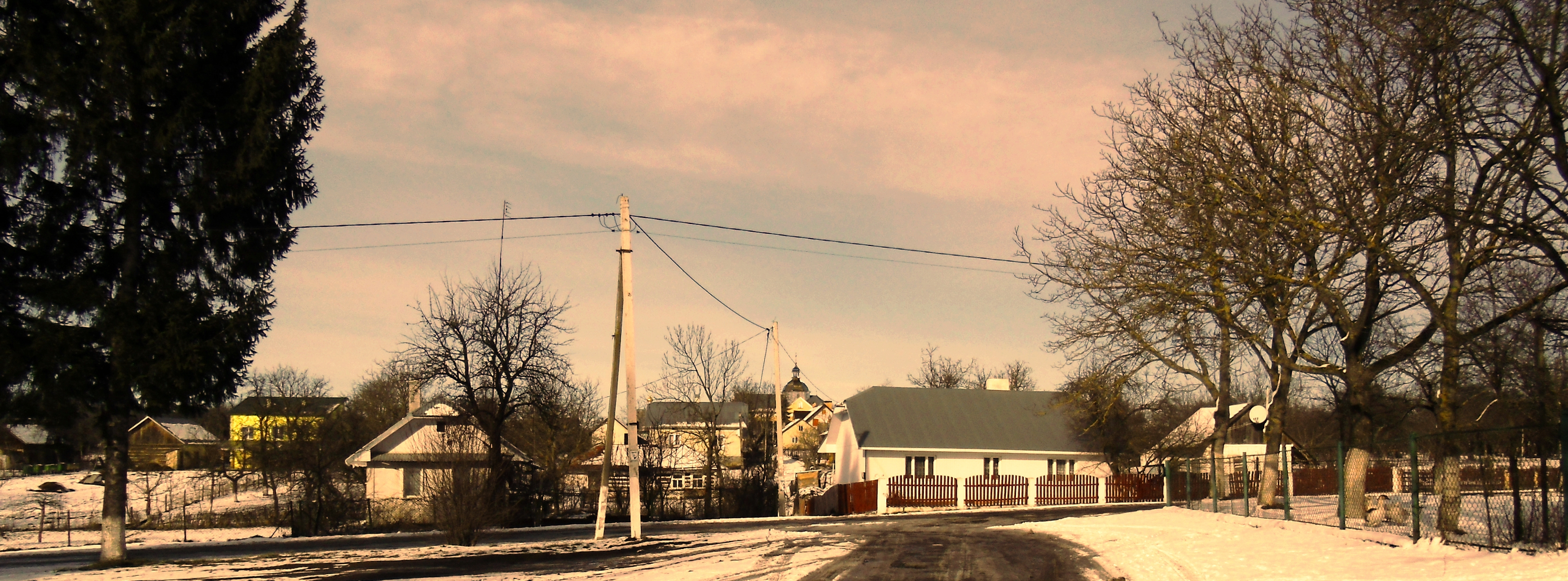

- Location within Lviv Oblast Location within Ukraine
- Coordinates: 49°30′18″N 23°16′45″E
- Country: Ukraine
- Oblast: Lviv Oblast
- District: Sambir Raion
- Established: 1284

Area
  - Total: 254 km^{2} (98 sq mi)
- Elevation /(average value of): 307 m (1,007 ft)

Population
  - Total: 1,517
  - Density: 64.53/km^{2} (167.1/sq mi)
- Time zone: UTC+2 (EET)
  - Summer (DST): UTC+3 (EEST)
- Postal code: 81476
- Area code: +380 3236
- Website: село Кульчиці^{(Ukrainian)}

Kulchytsi (Ukrainian: Ку́льчиці; historic names – Кульчачке, Кольчиці, Polish: Kulczyce) is a selo (village), which is located in Sambir Raion, Lviv Oblast, of Western Ukraine. It belongs to Ralivka rural hromada, one of the hromadas of Ukraine.

The estimated population is around 1,517. Local government is administered by Kulchytska village council.

== Geography ==
The village is situated on the hilly area at a distance 8 kilometres (5.0 mi) from the district center Sambir. It is situated in the 83 kilometres (52 mi) from the regional center Lviv and 29 kilometres (18 mi) from the city Drohobych.

== History ==
Archaeological excavations have revealed traces of settlements from the 5th to 4th centuries BC, although the official founding date of village is 1284. Thirteen Stone-Age burial mounds (late 3rd millennium BC) near Kulchytsi were investigated. The settlement beginning Iron Age (about the 7th or 6th century BC) have been preserved in territory of village

A historic name of the village was Kulchachke (Кульчачке; Ukrainian of Tatar origin).

In the Second Polish Republic, the village was located in the Sambir County of the Lwów Voivodeship.

On April 17, 1944, Ukrainian nationalists from the OUN-UPA murdered 15 Poles here as a part of Volhynia genocide. On August 8, 1944, the village was captured by Soviet forces.

== Religious structures and attractions ==
Christians have an opportunity to visit the Exaltation of the Holy Cross Orthodox Church, Church of the Transfiguration and Church of Saints Florus and Laurus.

In the village has an architectural monument of local importance of Sambir Raion (Sambir district). It is a wooden bell tower of Church of Florus and Laurus 18th century (499-М).

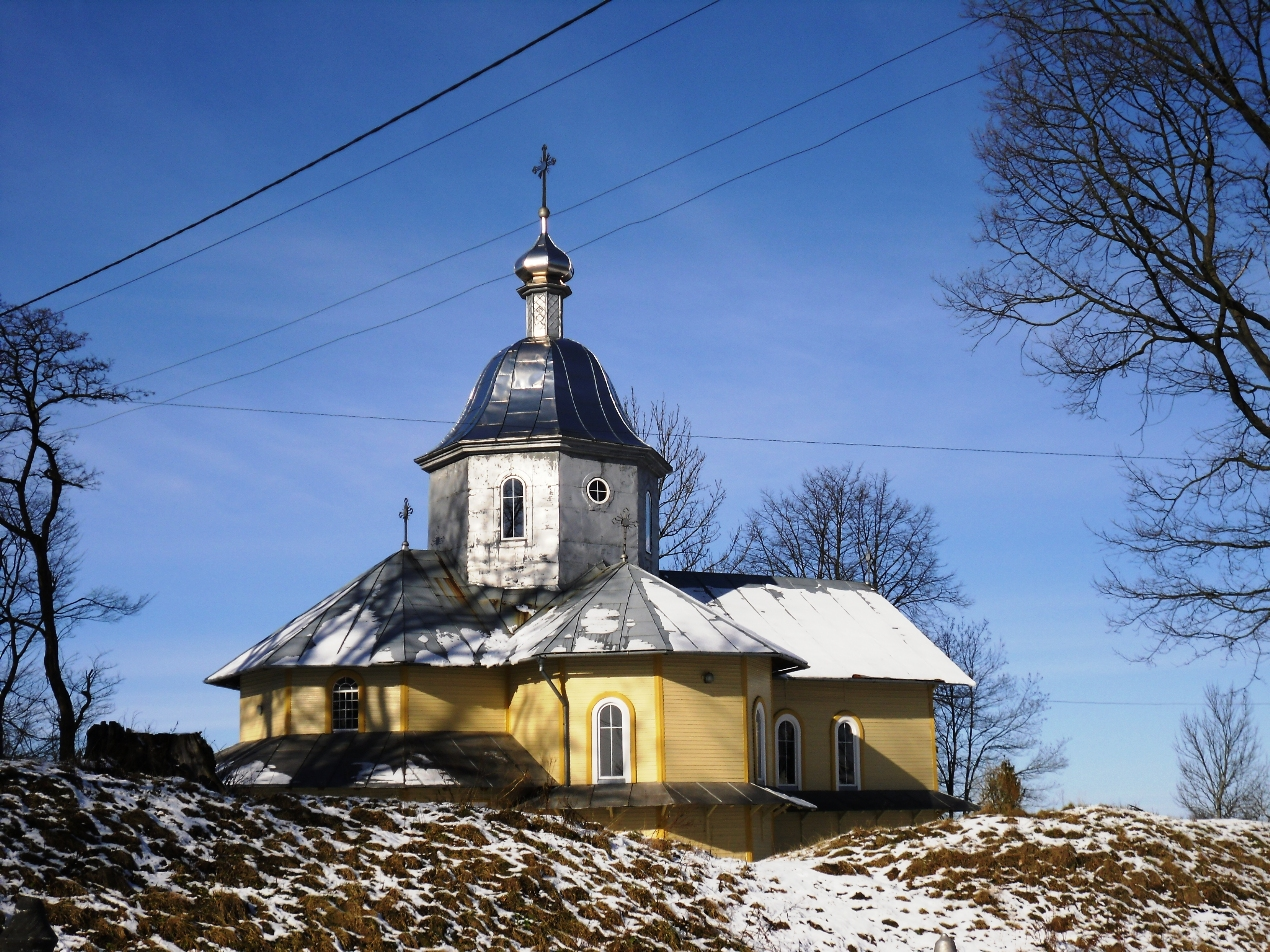
Church of Saints Florus and Laurus

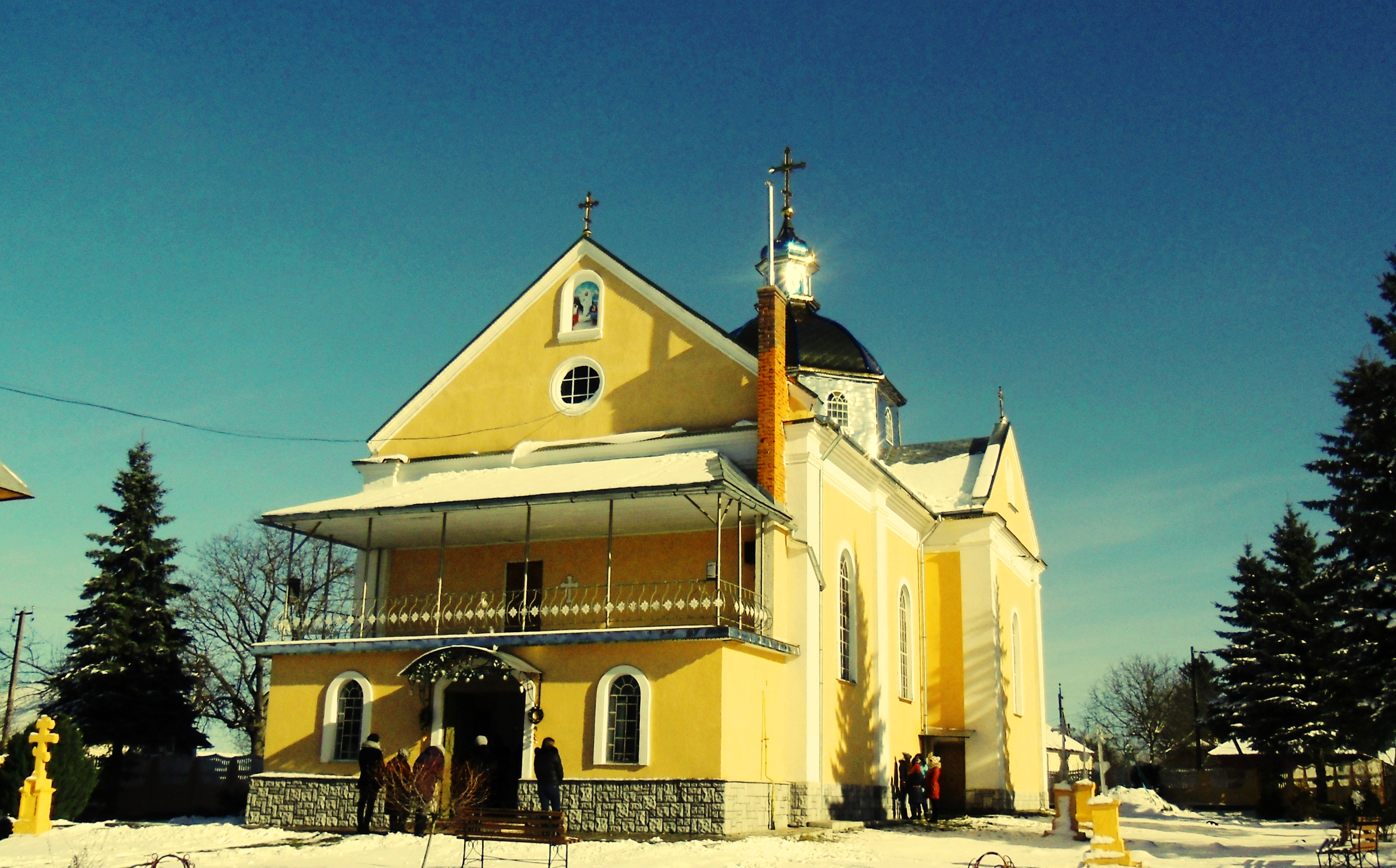
Exaltation of the Holy Cross Orthodox Church

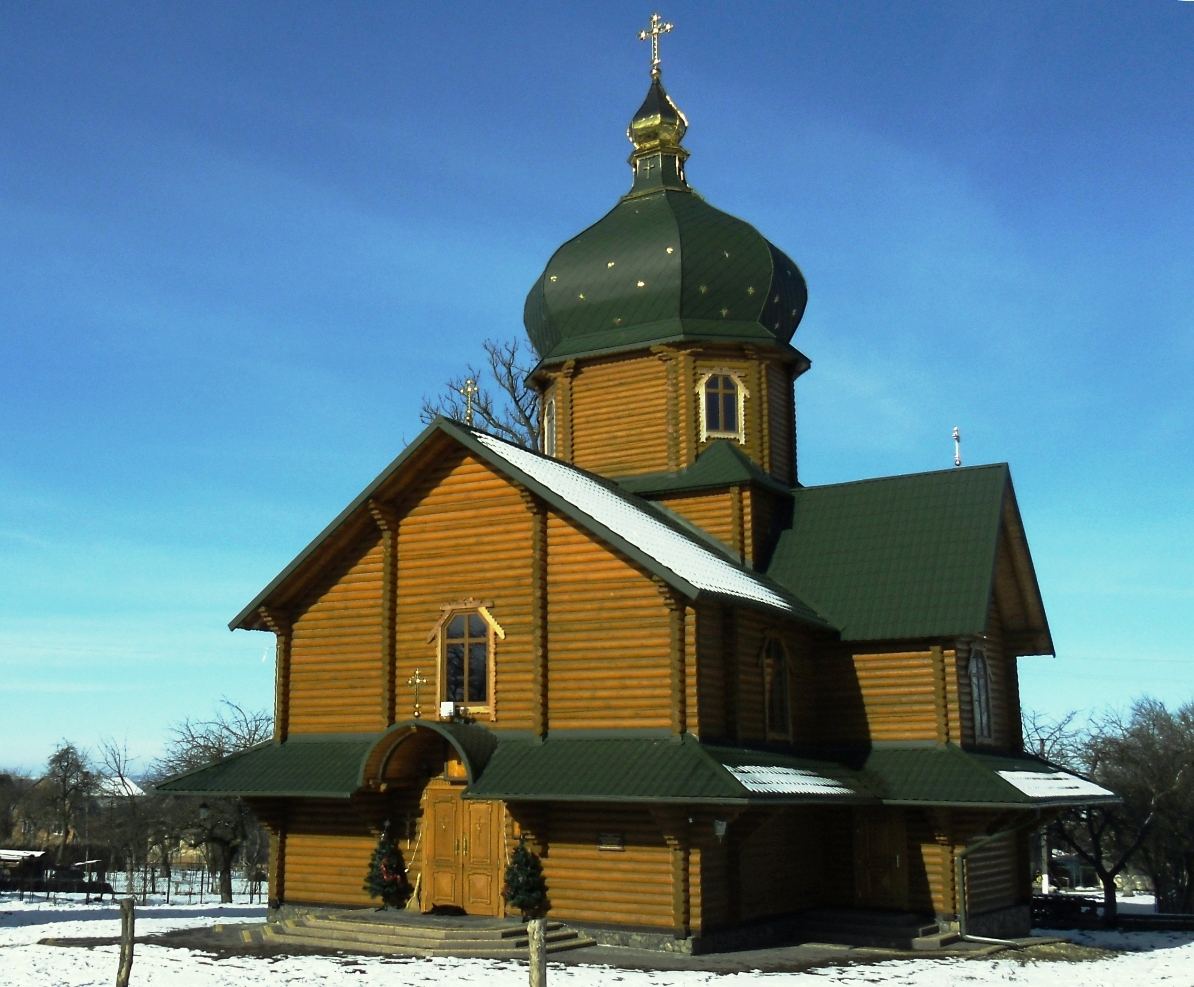
A newly built wooden Church of the Transfiguration.

== Museums and monuments ==
There is a museum of Hetman Sahaidachny, a monument to Hetman Petro Sahaidachny, Yuri-Franz Kulchytsky monument, a wooden Bell tower of Church of Florus and Laurus 18th century.

The idea of the museum foundation appeared in 1992, when the monument to Petro Konashevych-Sahaydachny was opened. It was decided to found the museum in the native village of the Ukrainian Hetman who had played the most important part in the history of Ukrainian Cossacks. Museum Director Bogdan Sydor is one of the founders of the museum.

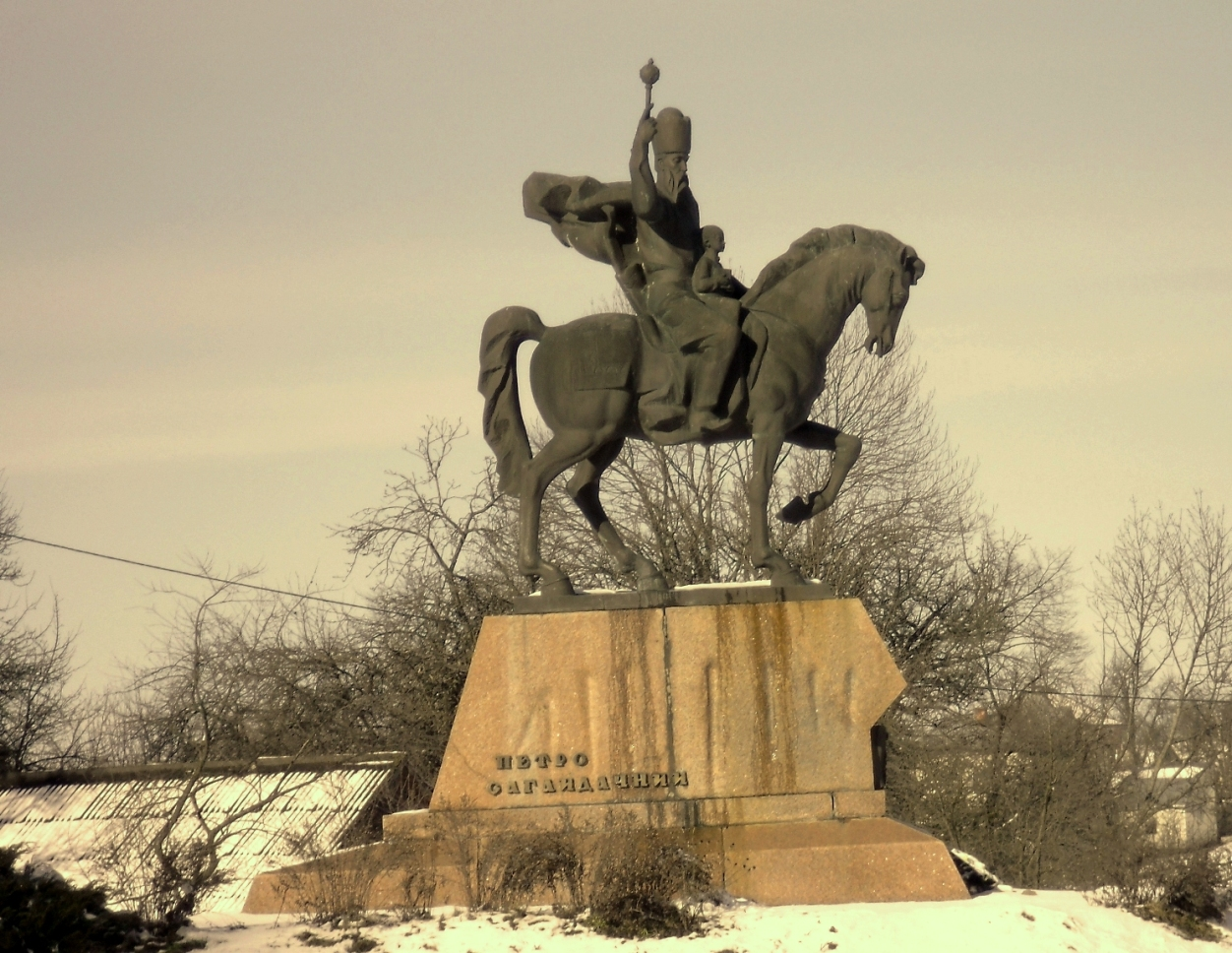
Equestrian of Petro Konashevych-Sahaidachny

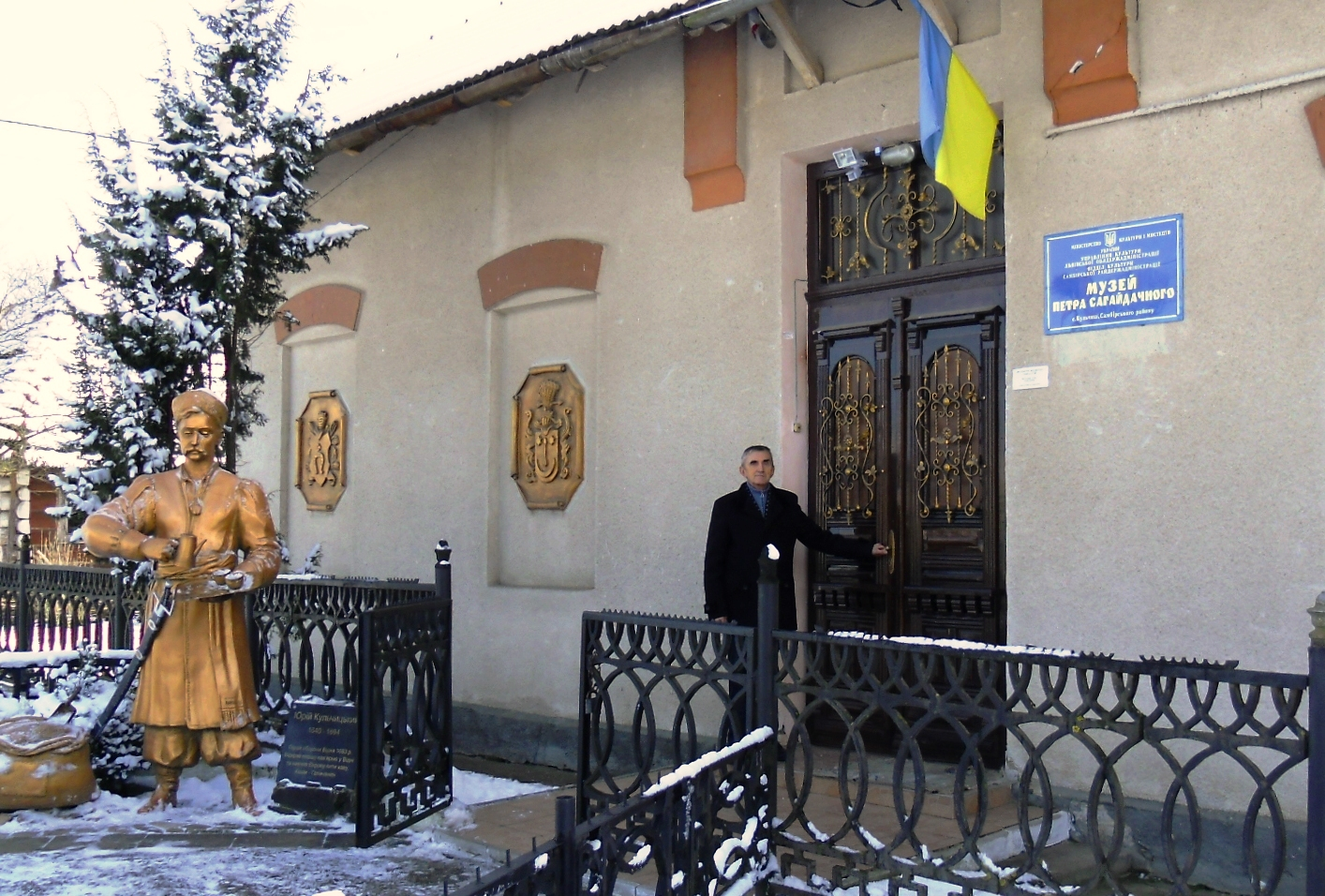
Museum by name Petro Konashevych-Sahaidachny

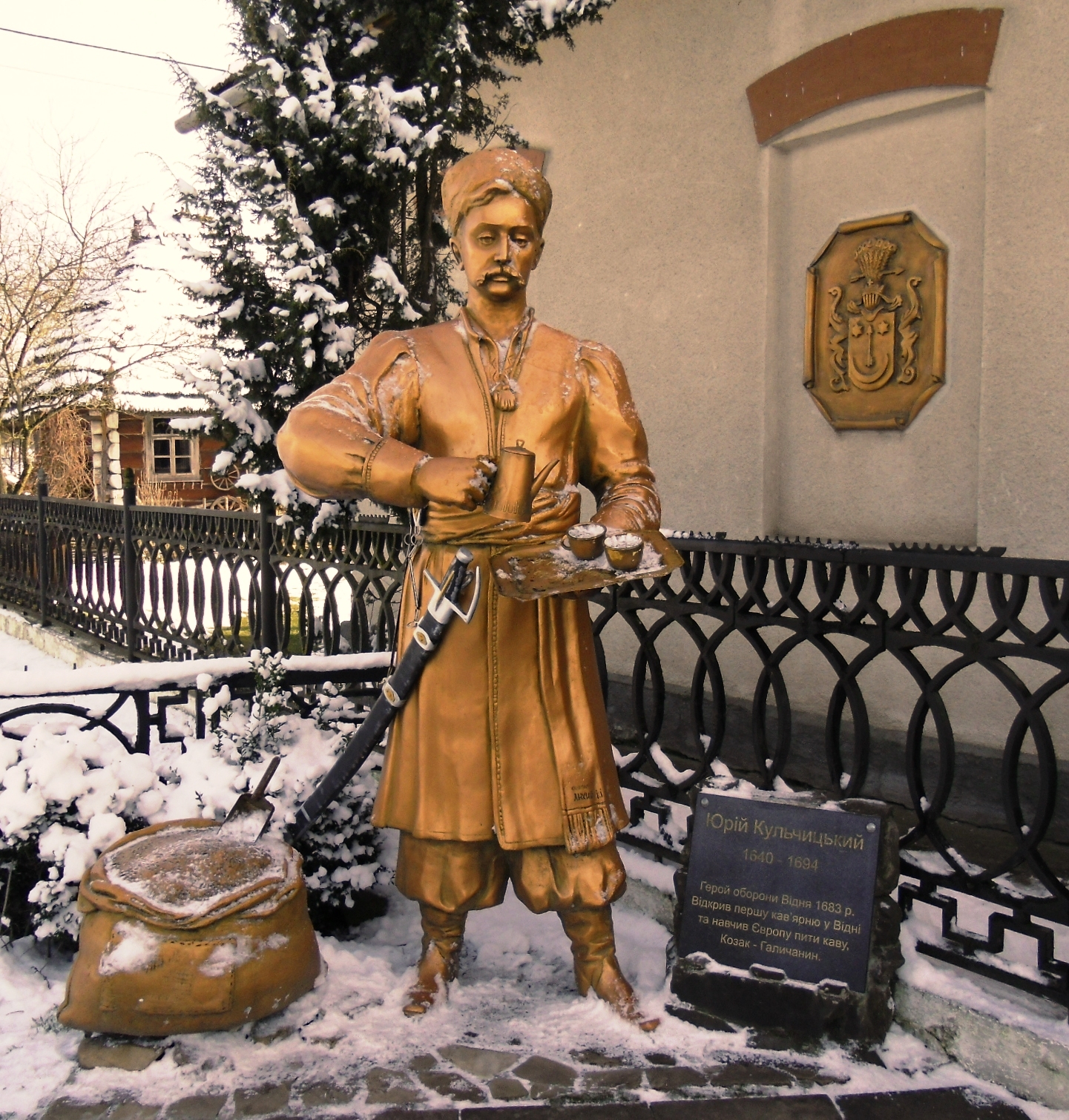
Jerzy Franciszek Kulczycki monument

== Famous people ==
- Petro Konashevych-Sahaidachny (1570–1622) — Cossack otaman and hetman of the Zaporozhian Host; a founder of the Kyiv Brotherhood (an Orthodox brotherhood), and supporter of the Orthodox Church in Ukraine and the Kyiv Mohyla Academy
- Marko Zhmaylo-Kulchytskyy — hetman of Registered Cossacks; leader of the Zhmaylo Uprising of 1625
- Jerzy Franciszek Kulczycki (1640–1694) — political and civic leader of the Polish-Lithuanian Commonwealth; coffee businessman
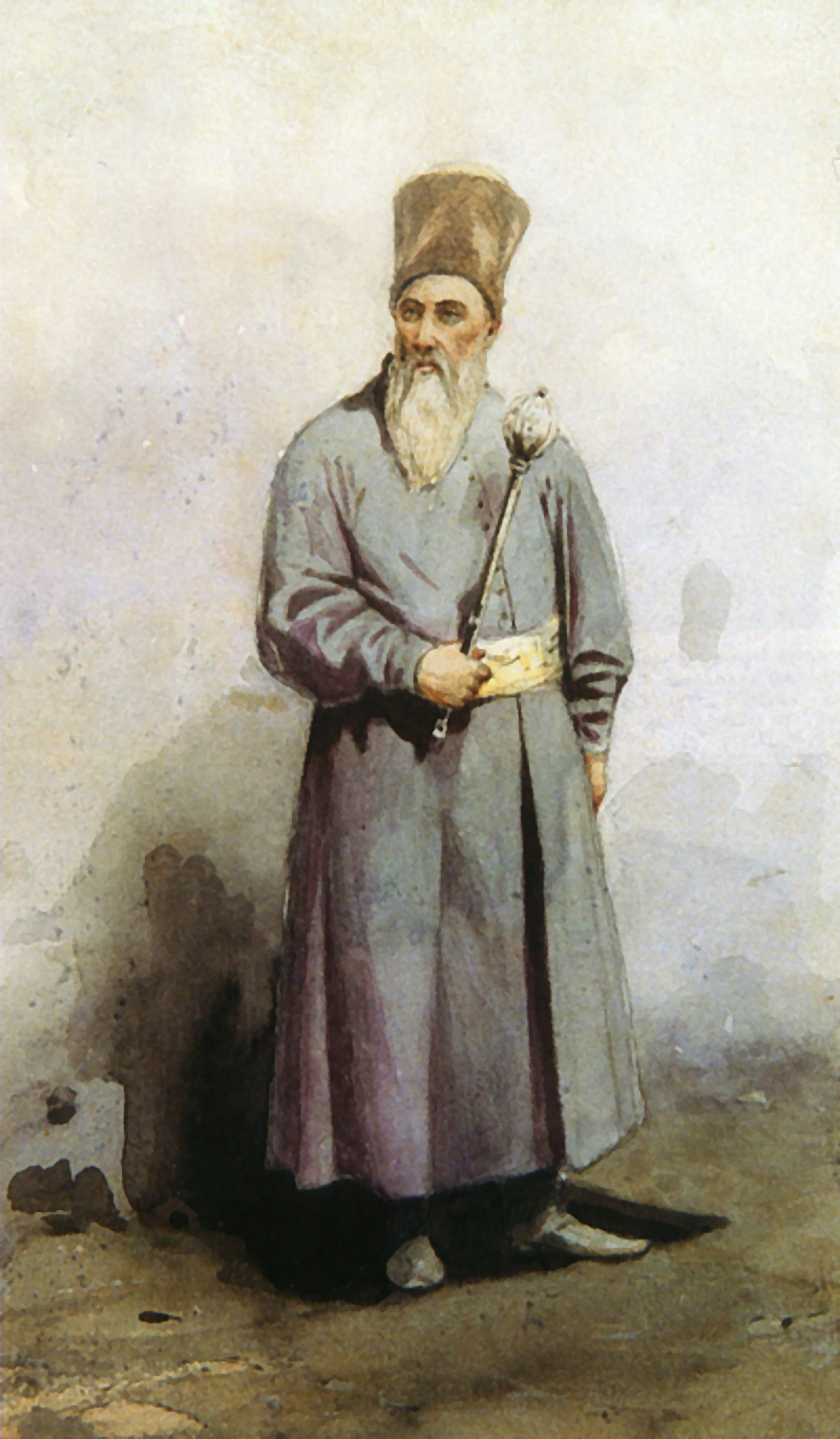
Petro Konashevych-Sahaidachny

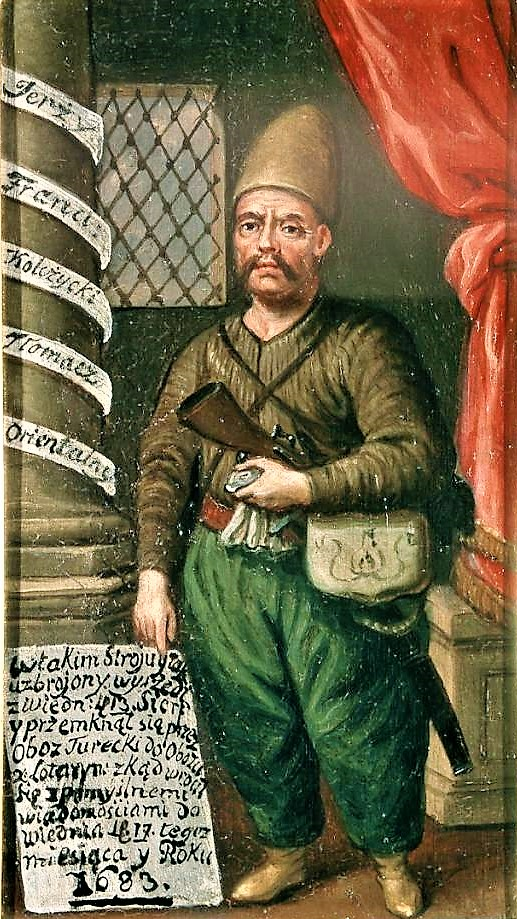
Jerzy Franciszek Kulczycki
