= Kyiv Boryspil Express =

Ukrainian railway airport rail link

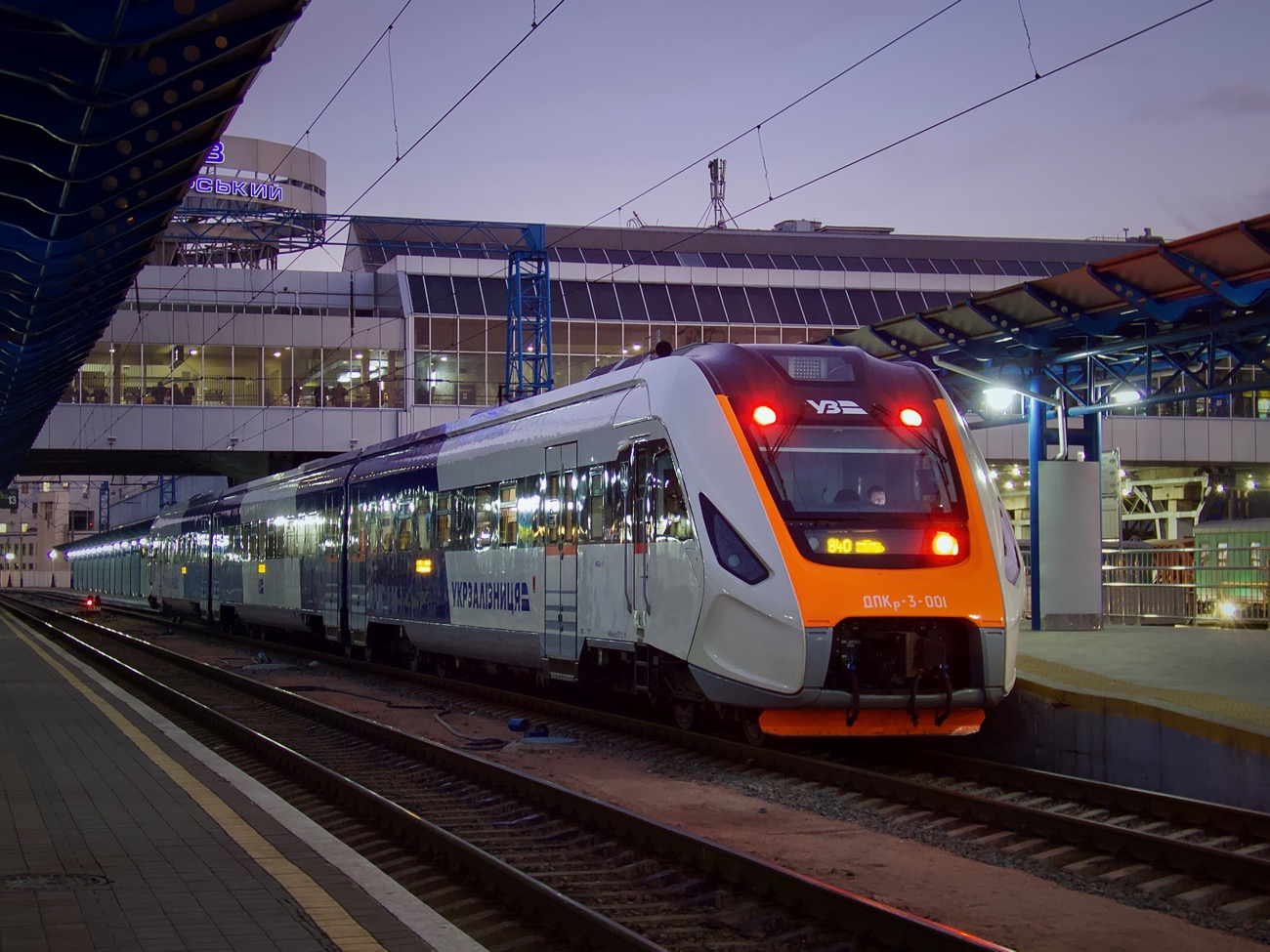
- DPKr-3 at Kyiv-Pasazhyrskyi Railway Station
- Main route: Kyiv – Boryspil Airport
- Other route: None
- Fleet: 5 Pesa 620M, 1 DPKr3
- Stations called at: 4
- Parent company: Ukrainian Railways

Other
- Website: kbp.aero/en/kiev-boryspol-express

The Kyiv Boryspil Express is an airport rail link in Ukraine between Boryspil International Airport and Kyiv, opened in November 2018. It is operated by Ukrzaliznytsia, Ukraine's state-owned rail operator.

== History ==
Departure from Boryspil Airport Station

Initially, the project was implemented by the State Agency for Investment and Management of National Projects of Ukraine. Financing was provided by Eximbank of China. PricewaterhouseCoopers has developed a business plan for the implementation of the national Air Express project. In 2017, the project was stalled after a string of scandals.

On 16 February 2018, the Cabinet of Ministers of Ukraine allocated funds for the implementation of the project and the works commenced in May. According to Prime Minister Volodymyr Groisman, the overall cost of the railroad project is ₴580,000,000. This does not include the price of the rolling stock, only its refurbishment. The Pesa SA rail buses used had previously operated local rural routes in Ukraine.

At the end of November 2018, all necessary construction works were performed. Parts of the platform of track 14 at Pasazhyrskyi station were heightened to provide easy access to the trains and a new Boryspil Airport station was built some 200 meters north of the airport's Terminal D. The Kyiv-Boryspil Express officially launched on 30 November 2018.

== Service ==
Trains depart/arrive at the 14th track and run every hour (non-peak) or every 30 minutes (peak). Journey time one way is 30–40 minutes.

Tickets cost ₴80 and can be purchased at cash desks at both stations, or at self-service terminals installed in Kyiv station concourse. Contactless card payment on-board is also possible.

== Stations ==
| Station | Image | Time | Interchange |
|---|---|---|---|
| Kyiv-Pasazhyrskyi | | 0 mins | Vokzalna Metro Station ( Sviatoshynsko–Brovarska line); Kyiv-Pasazhyrskyi railway station |
| Vydubychi | | 10 mins | Vydubychi Metro Station ( Syretsko–Pecherska line); Vydubychi Intercity Bus Station |
| Darnytsia | | 20 mins | Darnytsia Railway Station |
| Boryspil-Aeroport | | 40 mins | Kyiv Boryspil Airport Terminal D |

== Rolling stock ==
| Class | Type | Top speed | | Carriages | Number | Routes operated |
| Class | Type | mph | km/h | Carriages | Number | Routes operated |
|---|---|---|---|---|---|---|
| Pesa 620M | Railbus | 75 | 120 | 1 | 5 | Kyiv – Boryspil Airport |
| DPKr3 | Diesel multiple unit | 87 | 140 | 1 | 1 | Kyiv – Boryspil Airport |

== See also ==
- Gatwick Express
