= Boryspil Airport railway station =

Railway station in Boryspil International Airport, Ukraine

Boryspil Airport Бориспіль-Аеропорт
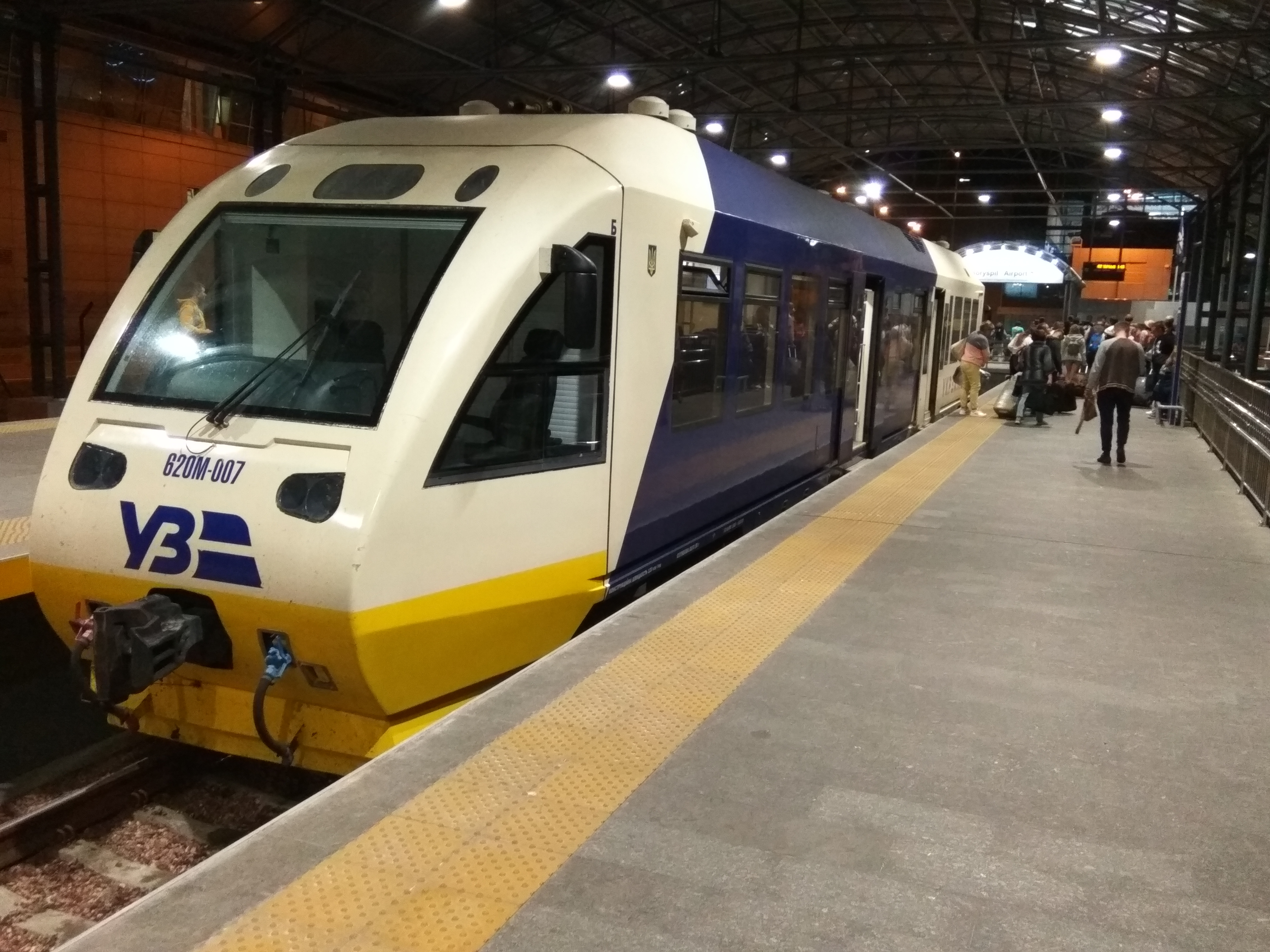

General information
- Location: Ukraine
- Coordinates: 50.3540°N 30.8973°E
- Owner: Ukrzaliznytsia
- Platforms: 2

Construction
- Structure type: At-grade
- Cycle facilities: Allowed

History
- Opened: 2018

Services
Preceding station	Ukrainian Railways	Following station
Darnytsia toward Kyiv-Pasazhyrskyi	Kyiv Boryspil Express	Terminus
Location

Boryspil Airport railway station (Ukrainian: Бориспіль-Аеропорт) is a train station of the Kyiv branch of the Southwestern Railways, which serves Terminal D at Boryspil International Airport. The Kyiv Boryspil Express trains serve the station, taking passengers directly to central Kyiv.

== Services ==
The station has services running directly to Kyiv and Darnytsia, provided by Boryspil Express, normally running every hour.

The station was opened on 30 November 2018 upon the completion of the Kyiv Boryspil Express Rail Link linking Boryspil Airport with direct non-stop services to Kyiv. Boryspil Airport is a dead-end passenger station, terminus for the 19 km - Boryspil Airport line (which is a branch from the Darnytsia to Hrebinka line segment).

Since 2018, the station has been served by Southwestern Railways, part of the Ukrainian Railways. Adjoins the terminal directly. Journey time one way is 30–40 minutes.

In 2018, the ticket price was UAH 100 and was available at self-service terminals. Passengers can also buy tickets on the trains using contactless cards.

== See also ==
- Ukrzaliznytsia
