= Jerzy Franciszek Kulczycki =

Polish nobleman (1640–1694)

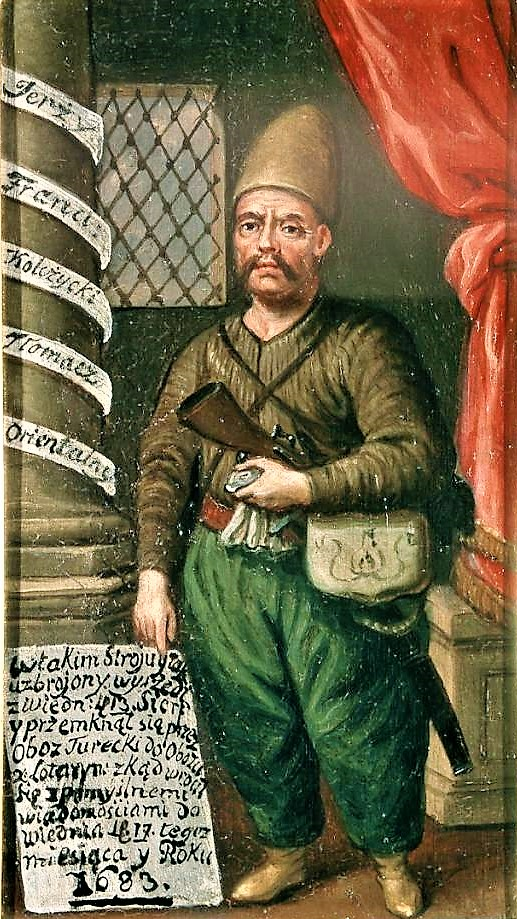
- Portrait of Kulczycki in Turkish attire, Czartoryski Museum
- Born: 1640; Kulczyce, Polish–Lithuanian Commonwealth (now in Ukraine)
- Died: 19 February 1694 (aged 53–54); Vienna, Habsburg monarchy
- Occupations: Merchant, spy, diplomat, soldier, coffee-house proprietor
- Known for: Heroism during the Battle of Vienna. Opening one of the first coffee houses in Vienna

Jerzy Franciszek Kulczycki of the Sas coat of arms (German: Georg Franz Kolschitzky, Ukrainian: Юрій-Франц Кульчицький, romanized: Yurii-Frants Kulchytskyi; 1640 – 19 February 1694) was a Polish nobleman of Ruthenian origin, diplomat, and spy during the Great Turkish War. For his actions at the 1683 Battle of Vienna, when he managed to get out of the besieged city to seek help, he was considered a hero by the local people. According to legend, he is often cited as starting the first café in the city in 1683, using coffee beans left behind by the retreating Ottoman Turks. However, more recent sources suggest that the first coffeehouse in Vienna was opened by the Armenian Johannes Theodat (aka Johannes Diodato or Deodat and Owanes Astouatzatur) in 1685.

== Biography ==
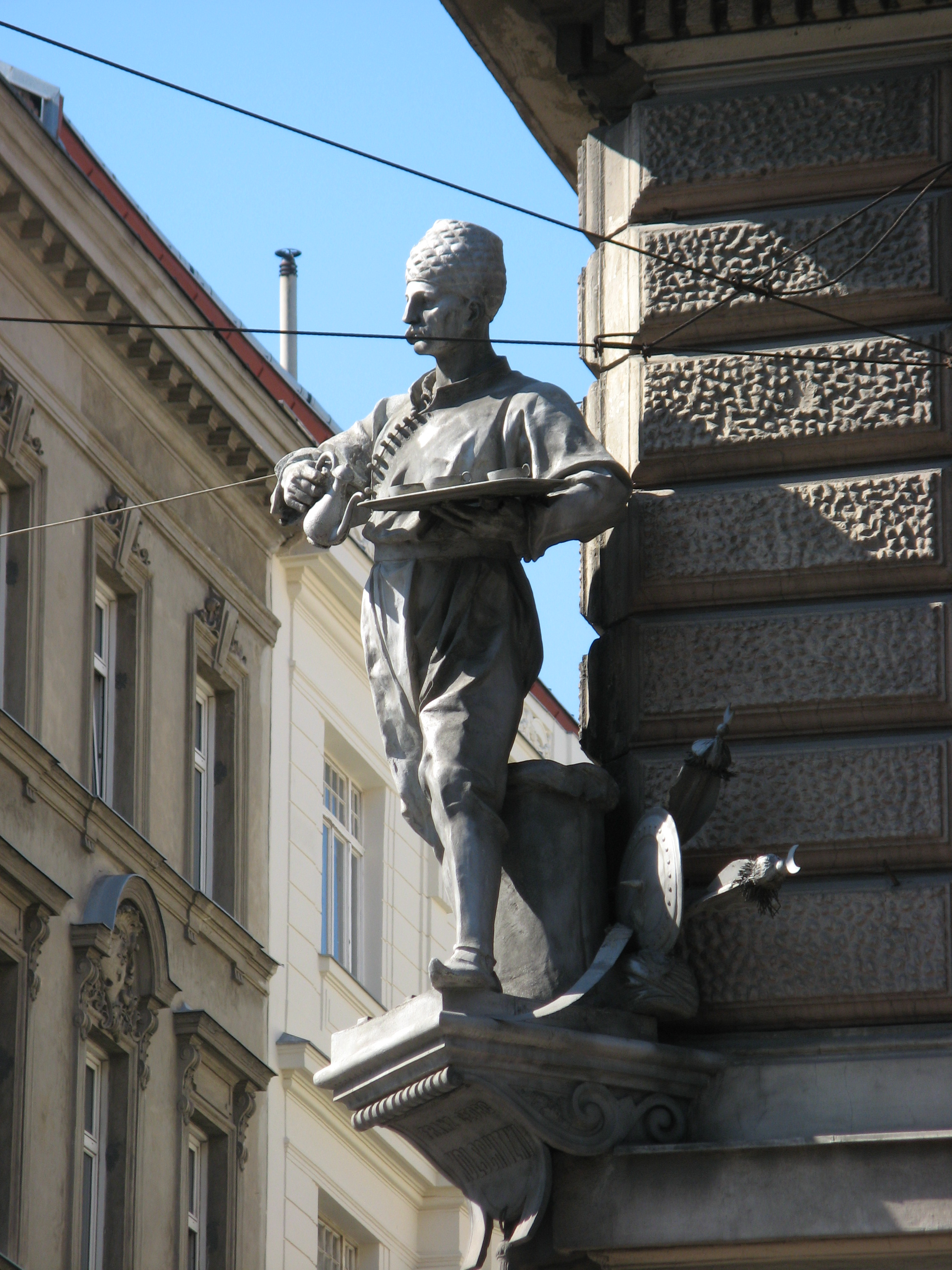
Monument to Kulczycki in Vienna, sculpted by Emanuel Pendl and erected in 1885 at the street named after him

Kulczycki was born in 1640 in Kulczyce, near Sambor, (then part of the Polish–Lithuanian Commonwealth, now western Ukraine). He was born into an old Orthodox-Ruthenian noble family, Kulchytsky-Shelestovych, although his father had converted to Catholicism.

He was fluent in Polish, Ruthenian (Ukrainian), Serbian, Turkish, German, Hungarian and Romanian languages. Kulczycki started to work as a translator for the Belgrade branch of the Austrian Oriental Company (Orientalische Handelskompagnie). When the Turkish authorities began repressing foreign traders as spies, he avoided arrest by claiming Polish citizenship and moved to Vienna, where through his earlier work he had gathered enough wealth to open up his own trading company in 1678.

During the Siege of Vienna (1683), he volunteered to leave the besieged and starving city and contact Duke Charles of Lorraine. Together with his trusty servant, the Serbian Đorđe Mihajlović, he left the city in Turkish attire and crossed enemy lines singing Ottoman songs. After contacting the duke, the pair managed to return to the city and reach it with a promise of imminent relief. Because of that information, the city council decided not to surrender to the Turkish forces of Kara Mustafa Pasha and continue the fight instead.

After the arrival of Christian forces led by the Polish king John III Sobieski, on 12 September the siege was broken. Kulczycki was considered a hero by the grateful townspeople of Vienna. The city council awarded him with a considerable sum of money and the burghers gave him a house in the borough of Leopoldstadt. King John III Sobieski himself presented Kulczycki with large amounts of coffee found in the captured camp of Kara Mustafa's army.

The story that Kulczycki opened a coffee house in Vienna at Schlossergassl near the cathedral, which was named the Hof zur Blauen Flasche ('House under the Blue Bottle') and other stories about him related to coffee were invented by Gottfried Uhlich in 1783. This was uncovered for the first time by historian Karl Teply in 1980. Kulczycki's descendant, historian Jerzy Sas Kulczycki, considered Teply's theory "pseudo-scientific", as it "negated all known, documented knowledge about Kulczycki, making him an Armenian on top of that".

Until recently, every year in October a special Kolschitzky feast was organized by the café owners of Vienna, who decorated their shop windows with Kulczycki's portrait, as noted by Polish historian and geographer Zygmunt Gloger. Kulczycki is memorialized with a statue on Vienna's Kolschitzky street, at the corner of the house Favoritenstraße 64.

== See also ==
- Szlachta
- Viennese coffee house
