= Zhmaylo uprising =

Cossack rebellion in the Polish-Lithuanian Commonwealth

- Part of Cossack uprisings
| Date | September– November 1625 |
| Location | Polish-Lithuanian Commonwealth (now Ukraine) |
| Result | Treaty of Kurukove |

Belligerents
| Polish–Lithuanian Commonwealth | Zaporozhian Cossacks |

Commanders and leaders
| Stanisław Koniecpolski | Marko Zhmaylo |

Strength
| 8,000 | Unknown |

The Zhmaylo uprising (Polish: Powstanie Żmajły) was a Cossack rebellion headed by Marek Zhmaylo against the Polish–Lithuanian Commonwealth in 1625. On 5 November Marek Zhmaylo was deprived of his title and Hetman Mykhailo Doroshenko was chosen to sign the Treaty of Kurukove, pledging allegiance to the Crown of the Kingdom of Poland.

== Background ==
In the late 16th century Poland introduced the institution of the Registered Cossacks, which granted some privileges to the militant Cossack people inhabiting territories of Ukraine, then mostly controlled by Poland. Cossacks were allowed to serve in special units in the Polish military, but during the times of peace the Poles intended to reduce the number of Cossacks on the register and turn them into peasants. This happened again after the Polish-Ottoman War, in which aftermath the 40,000 mobilized Cossacks led then by Hetman Petro Konashevych-Sahaidachny were reduced to 5,000.

Following the Cossacks' crucial role in defeating the Ottoman army at the Battle of Khotyn (1621), the Commonwealth initially tolerated them. However, by 1624, King Sigismund III Vasa, under intense pressure from the Ottoman Porte and the Polish-Lithuanian nobility (szlachta), who were terrified of another massive war, took action.

In response, the Cossacks began diplomatic endeavors with their Commonwealth neighbors, including the Tatars and Muscovy. The Polish-Lithuanian government sent a special commission headed by Hetman Stanisław Koniecpolski, but two attempts to negotiate a truce failed. In September 1625 Koniecpolski gathered an army to quell the unrest.

== Prelude ==
According to Leszek Podhorodecki, his forces numbered about 12,000, with 30 artillery pieces; and were composed of the regular army boosted by Registered Cossacks and forces of local nobility, both the pospolite ruszenie and some chorągiew units sponsored by the magnates. The Cossack leader Marek Zhmaylo had numerical superiority, gathering about 20,000 men under his banners.

== Uprising ==
On October 6 Koniecpolski left Bila Tserkva and headed south. Zhmaylo planned to draw the Polish army into the steppes, tire it out, cut its logistics, and only then engage it. In the meantime he retreated south, offering some resistance in the area of the village of Moszna and the river Cybulnik. On 24 October the Poles reached the town of Kryłów (Крилів), where the Cossacks had created a fortified camp. There the Poles dispersed the Cossack cavalry and assaulted their tabor formation. The Cossacks held during the day, but attempted to withdraw in the night, a move which turned into a panicked retreat.

Zhamaylo was able to restore order, helped by the fact that the Poles did not pursue the Cossacks till the following morning. At sunrise on 26 October the Poles caught up with the Cossacks near Lake Kurukove. The Polish cavalry charge got bogged down in the nearby swamps, and the Cossack counter-attack inflicted upon them serious casualties, turning the engagement into a siege of a new fortified camp. After several days the Cossacks removed Zhmaylo from command, and so negotiations began. Zhmaylo was replaced by Hetman Mykhailo Doroshenko who signed the Treaty of Kurukove with the Poles on 5 November 1625 (Podhorodecki gives 6 November).

== Aftermath ==
In the end, despite no conclusive battle having been fought, Koniecpolski prevailed on the diplomatic front. The Cossacks were granted amnesty, but had to agree to register only 6,000 and stop raiding Ottoman Empire lands. However, this agreement would not be long lasting.

== See also ==
- History of Cossacks
