= I-52 Mine layer vehicle =

I-52
- Type: Mine-laying vehicle
- Place of origin: Ukraine

Production history
- Designer: Kriukiv Machine-building Works
- Manufacturer: Kriukiv Machine-building Works

Specifications
- Length: 7.210m
- Width: 2.850m
- Height: 2.200m
- Crew: 2
- Engine: diesel
- Suspension: torsion bar
- Operational range: 500km
- Maximum speed: 61.5 km

The I-52 is a mine-laying vehicle designed in Ukraine by the Kriukiv Machine-building Works.

== Purpose and composition ==
The I-52 Mine-laying vehicle is intended for distant antipersonnel and Anti-tank mine laying. The vehicle ensures mine-laying in all weather and climatic conditions, during daylight or at night, in any temperature and on hilly terrain. The I-52 can also deploy mines while moving.

The vehicle includes multipurpose chassis MT-LBU and equipment which consists of:

- mine-laying control panel placed in control compartment;
- container unit for transportation and firing of mines from clusters;
- container unit lifting mechanism from traveling position to fire position;
- container adjusting mechanism;
- container unit traversing mechanism.
