= Kryukiv Railway Car Building Works =

Rolling stock manufacturer

Kriukiv Railway Car Manufacturing Plant Крюківський вагонобудівний завод

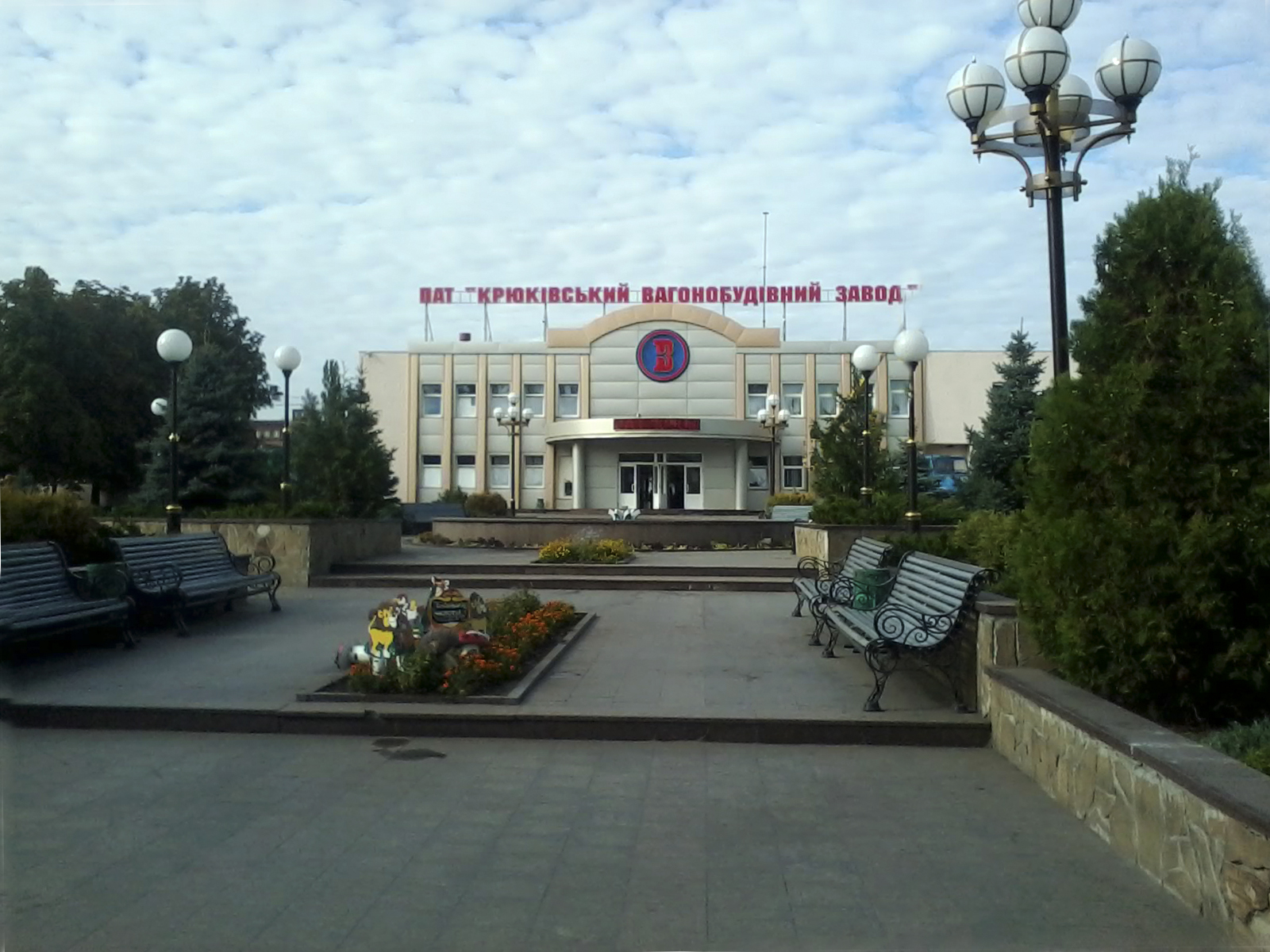
- Central entrance to the Kriukiv Railway Car Manufacturing Plant
- Native name: Крюківський вагонобудівний завод
- Type: Public Joint Stock Company
- Founded: 1869
- Headquarters: Kremenchuk, Poltava Oblast, Ukraine
- Revenue: 2,617,210,000 hryvnia (2025)
- Total assets: 5,185,122,000 hryvnia (2025)
- Website: Official website

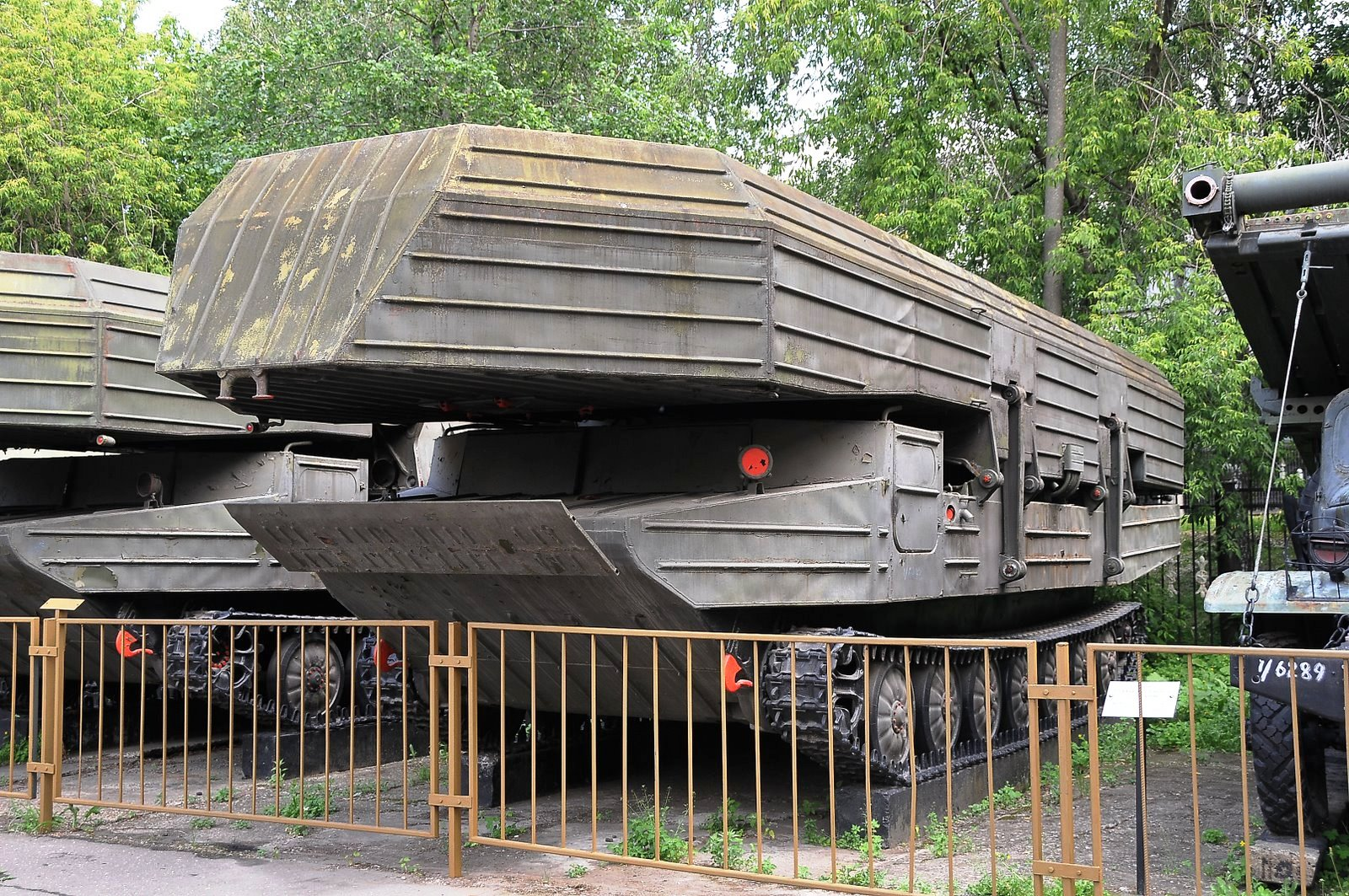
First build vehicle at the factory

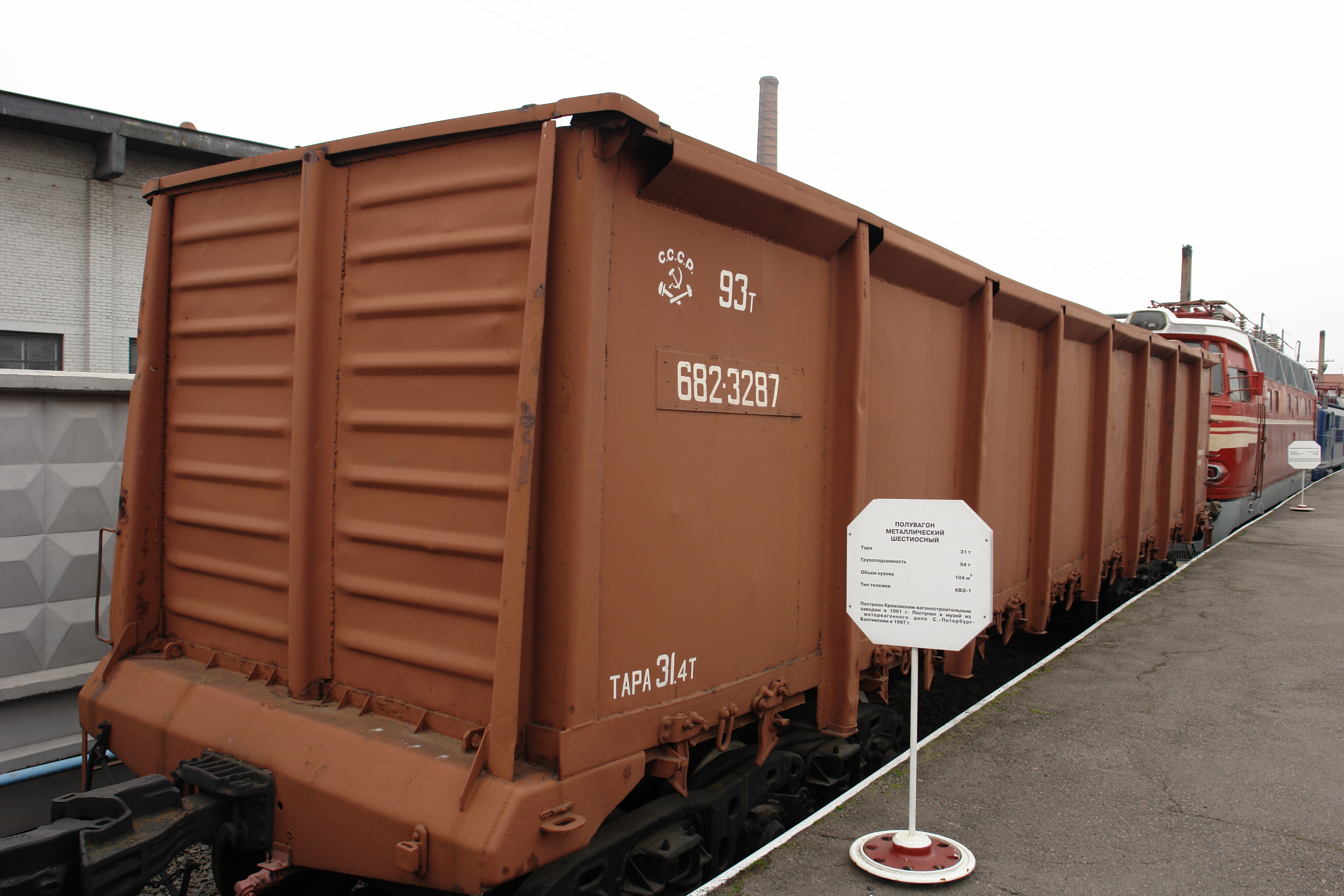
Railcar built in 1961

Kriukiv Railway Car Manufacturing Plant (Ukrainian: Крюківський вагонобудівний завод, КВБЗ; KVBZ) is a large industrial company in Kremenchuk, Ukraine, manufacturing locomotives and multiple unit trains.

== History ==
The foundation for the first buildings of the Krukiv Railway Car Manufacturing Plant was laid in 1869. As for 1900 there have been working 400 workers, who provided repairs for 120 freight and 20 passenger cars per month.

In 2013, Kriukiv Carriage Works was ranked 10th in the rating of high-tech machine building enterprises in Ukraine in terms of management innovations. The main program of the plant's work is the development and production of mainline passenger and freight cars of various types, trucks, spare parts, wheel sets, railway wheels, subways, road construction equipment, escalators, etc.

In January-June 2018, the plant increased freight car production by 69% compared to the same period in 2017. In quantitative terms, this growth is 706 freight cars more, up to 1,728 units.

In July 2018, PJSC Ukrzaliznytsia held a tender for the purchase of 53 new passenger railcars worth UAH 2.6 billion, which was won by Kriukiv Railcar. Under the terms of the tender, the plant is to deliver the cars to Ukrzaliznytsia by July 1, 2019: 21 compartment cars, 20 SV-type compartment cars, 11 cars with a train manager's compartment, and 2 compartment cars for international passenger transportation.

As a result of the tender, the company is to manufacture six DPKr-3 diesel trains in 2018-19, consisting of three cars - an intermediate non-motorized 63-7084A, a head motorized 63-7083A and a head motorized 63-7083A-01 equipped to carry passengers in wheelchairs. The cost of one train is UAH 176.97 million. The trains are to be delivered to the Ternopil Motor Car Depot of the Lviv Railways regional branch.

== Production ==
=== Passenger ===
- High speed interregional train EKr-1 Tarpan
- High speed interregional train DPKr-2
- High speed interregional train DPKr-3
- Passenger coaches 779 series
- Passenger coaches 788 series

=== Products for Metro ===
- Front metro car mod. 81-7021
- Intermediate metro car mod.81-7037
- Intermediate metro car mod.81-7022
- Front metro car mod. 81-7036

=== Military vehicles ===
- I-52 Mine layer vehicle

==== Formerly ====
- GSP 55
- PMM 2M

== Gallery ==
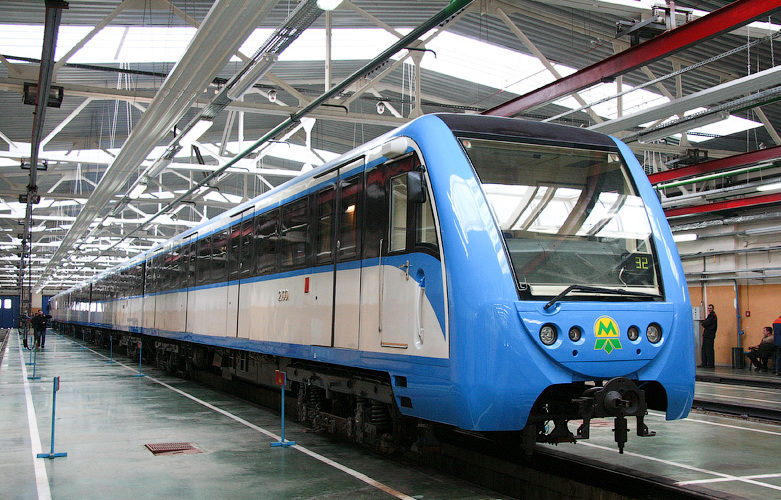
Intermediate metro car mod.81-7022

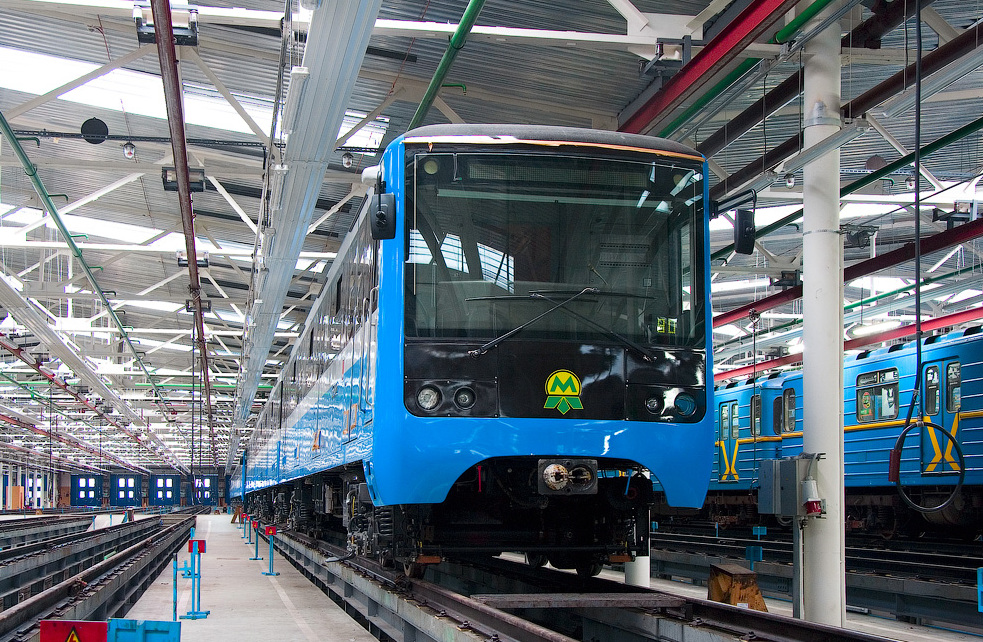
Intermediate metro car mod.81-7037

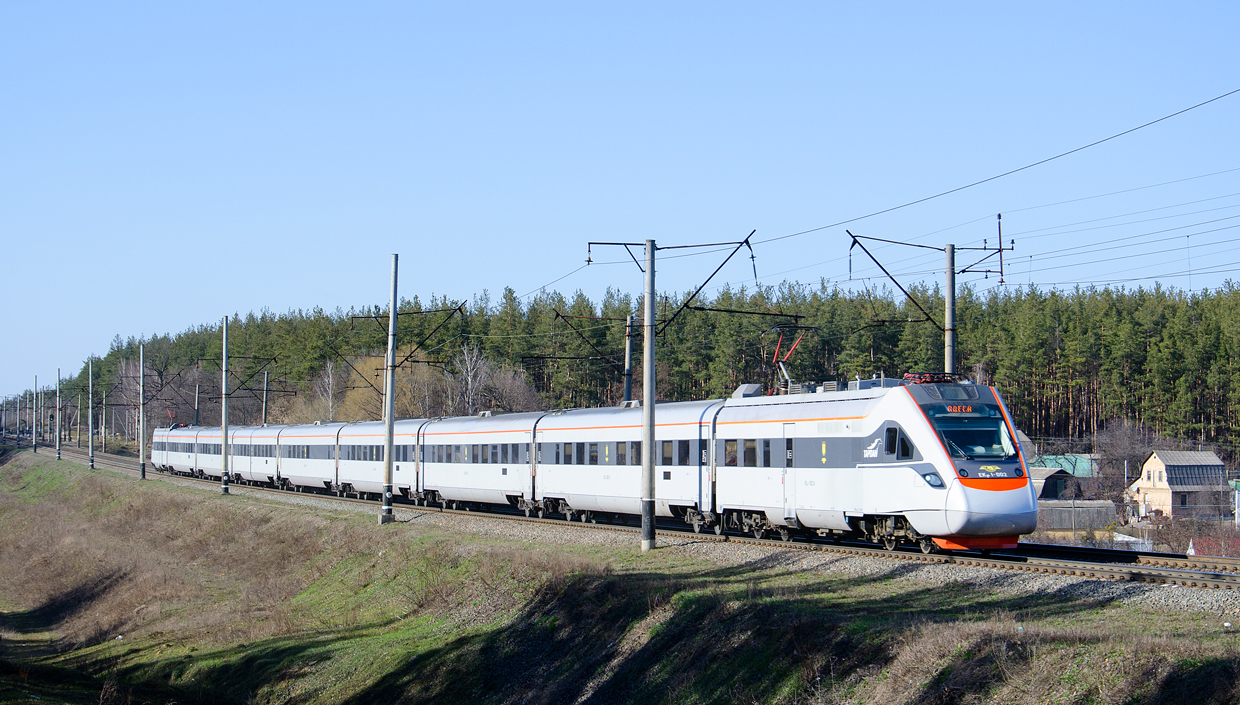
High speed interregional train EKr-1

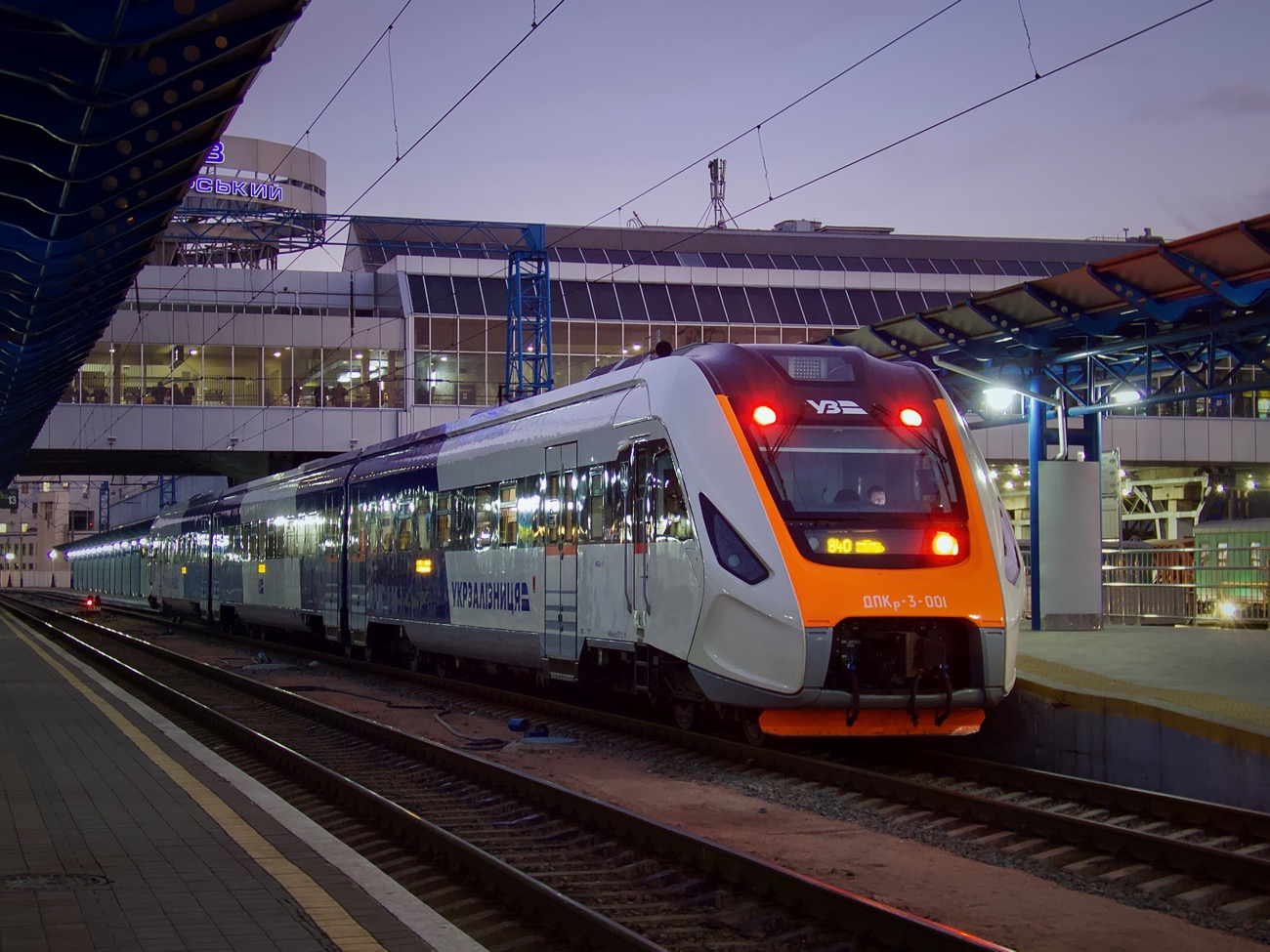
DPKr3-001 at the Kyiv-Pasazhyrskyi railway station
