= Lake Kurukove =

Kurukove
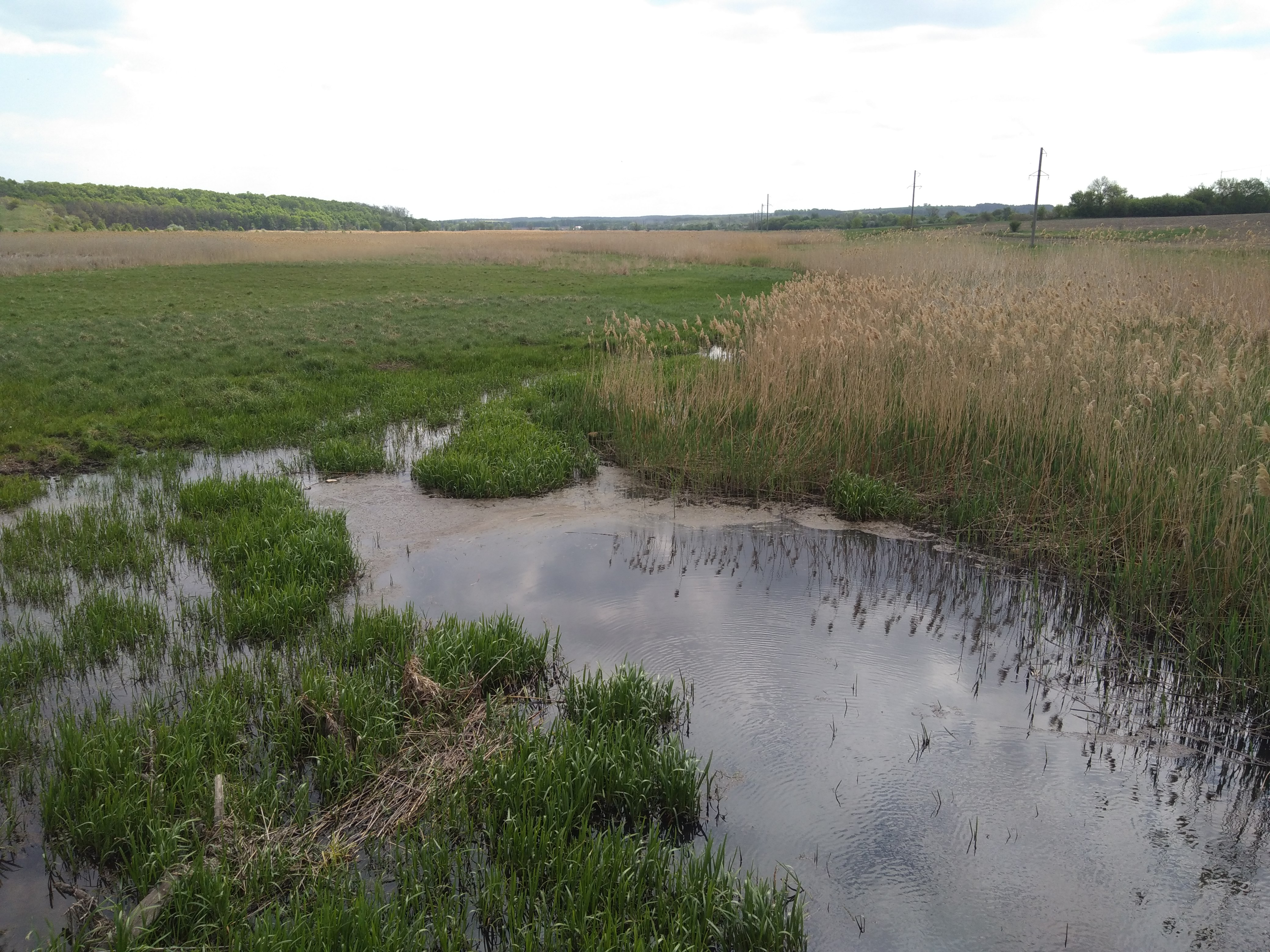
- Tsybulnik River

- Location within Poltava Oblast Location within Ukraine Location within Europe
- Interactive map of Kurukove
- Location: Poltava Oblast
- Coordinates: 49°00′35″N 33°24′00″E
- Type: former lake
- Basin countries: Ukraine
- Settlements: Kremenchuk

Kurukove (Ukrainian: Курукове Озеро) was a fresh water lake located in the central Ukrainian oblast of Poltava, on the right bank of the Dnieper, opposite the city of Kremenchuk.

== History ==
It was the site of Kurukove lake battle near the Tsybulnik River delta, fought between Ukrainian Cossacks and the Poles from 25 October to 3 November 1625. In 1625, the Treaty of Kurukove was signed at the site, establishing an agreement between the Ukrainian Cossacks and the Poles.
