= Treaty of Kurukove =

1625 treaty between Poland-Lithuania and Ukrainian Cossacks

The Treaty of Kurukove (Ukrainian: Куруківський Договір) was an agreement between Hetman Stanisław Koniecpolski of the Polish–Lithuanian Commonwealth and Mykhailo Doroshenko of the Ukrainian Cossacks. After four days of negotiations, it was signed on 5 November 1625 (O.S. 26 October 1625) near Lake Kurukove, in what is now Kremenchuk. The treaty was a response to Marek Zhmaylo's uprising and a Crimean-Zaporozhian alliance under Mehmed III Giray. The treaty's provisions amounted to a compromise; Cossack liberties were extended, but not all the Cossack demands were met, which led to further tensions.

== Terms ==
- Amnesty for rebels who participated in raids against Turkish territories, estates of the Ukrainian gentry, and crown estates, "provided that henceforth obedience and respect be vouchsafed to the starosty and Officialdom"
- The right of the Kozaks to elect their own Hetman, pending confirmation of the Polish King
- The Registered Cossacks was increased to 6,000 men, and those in the register were to be paid an annual salary by Poland (this was increased to 8000 by the 1630 Treaty of Pereiaslav)
- Independent Kozak campaigns against Turkey were prohibited
- The Kozaks could have no relations with other countries "no alliances with any neighboring state be made nor any delegations from other states be received, nor any communication through envoys, nor any service for foreign states be undertaken." (cf. Mehmed III Giray)
- If these conditions were broken, "the Commonwealth will proceed as if against enemies.”
