= Castle Square, Warsaw =

Square in Warsaw, Poland

Castle Square
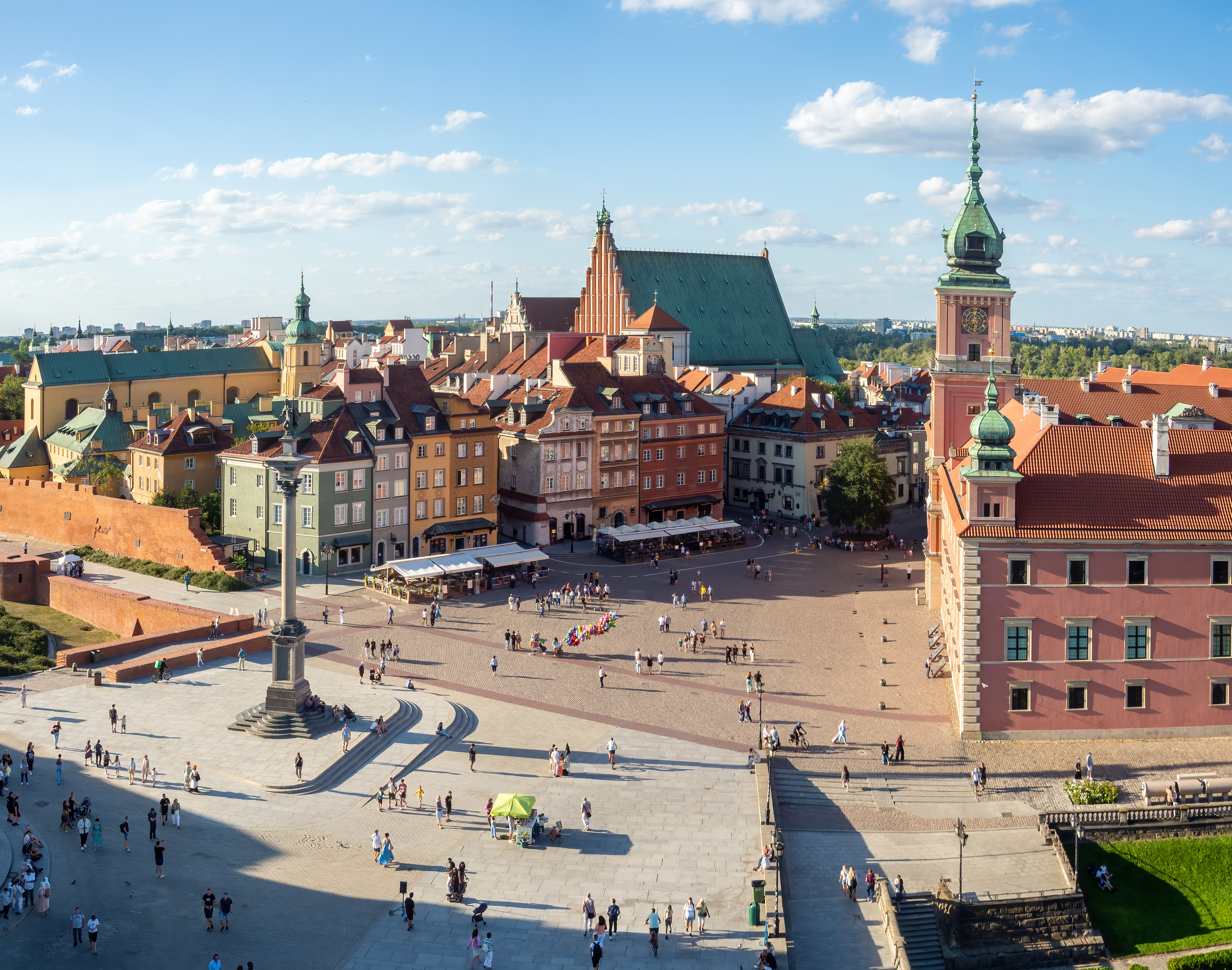
- Castle Square in 2024, with Sigismund's Column (left), Royal Castle (right) and Warsaw's Old Town and St. John's Cathedral (top)
- Interactive map of Castle Square
- Native name: plac Zamkowy (Polish)
- Namesake: Royal Castle, Warsaw
- Type: Square
- Maintained by: Warsaw City Council
- Location: Śródmieście, Warsaw, Poland
- Coordinates: 52°14′51″N 21°0′49″E
- South: Royal Road

UNESCO World Heritage Site
- Type: Cultural
- Criteria: ii, vi
- Designated: 1980
- Part of: Historic Centre of Warsaw
- Reference no.: 30bis

Historic Monument of Poland
- Designated: 1994-09-08
- Part of: Warsaw – historic city center with the Royal Route and Wilanów
- Reference no.: M.P. 1994 nr 50 poz. 423

Castle Square (Polish: plac Zamkowy, pronounced [ˈplat͡s zamˈkɔ.vɘ]) is a historic square in front of the Royal Castle – the former official residence of Polish monarchs – located in Warsaw, Poland. It is a popular meeting place for tourists and locals. The square, of somewhat triangular shape, features the landmark Sigismund's Column to the south-west, and is surrounded by historic townhouses. It marks the beginning of the bustling Royal Route extending to the south.

== History ==
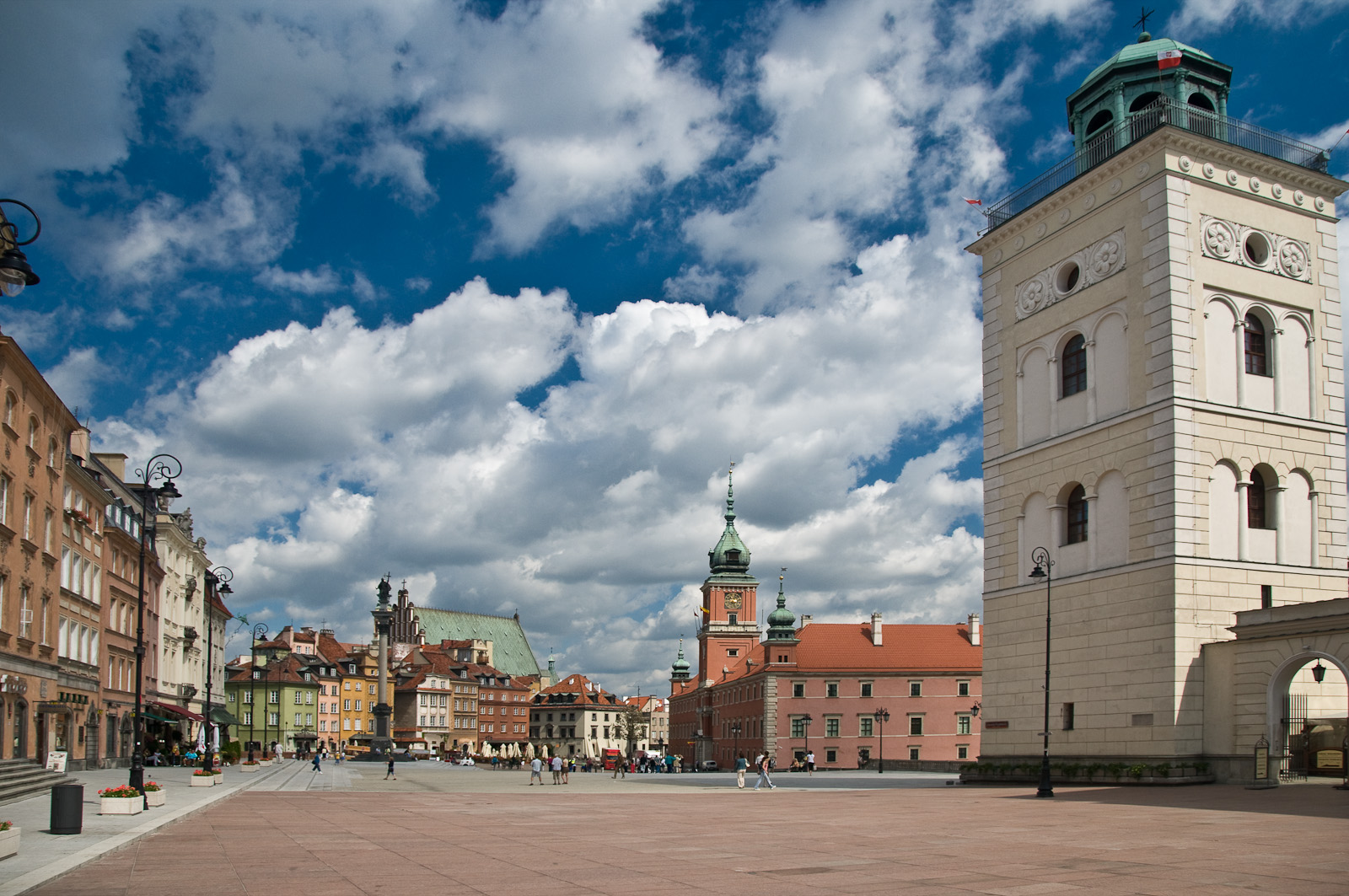
Castle Square, with tower of St. Anne's Church at right

The column commemorating King Sigismund III of Poland (a work by Clemente Molli, erected in 1644) is the oldest and one of the symbolic landmarks of the city and the first secular monument in the form of a column in the country.

On the east side of the square stands the Royal Castle, reconstructed after the devastation of World War II. It was formerly the residence of the dukes of Mazovia, and then of the Polish kings and grand dukes of Lithuania from the 16th to 18th centuries. The Germans bombed and blew it up at the beginning of World War II (September 1939), and then it was completely destroyed in 1944–45 (see picture below). The rebuilding of the Old Town continued until the mid-1960s and the Royal Castle opened to visitors in 1984. In 1980, Warsaw Old Town was inscribed on the UNESCO World Heritage List as an example of near-total reconstruction of a historic centre.

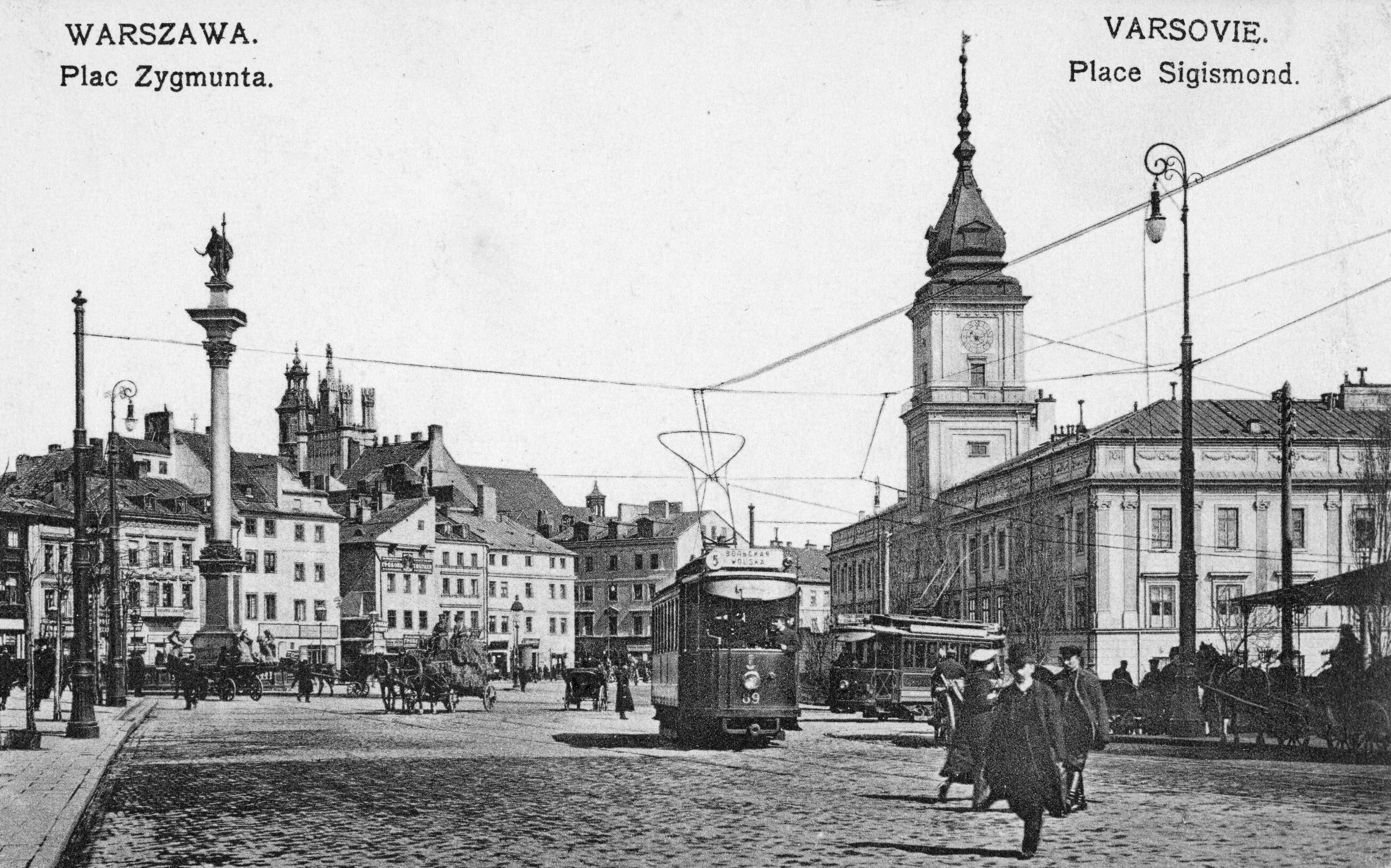
Castle Square in 1910

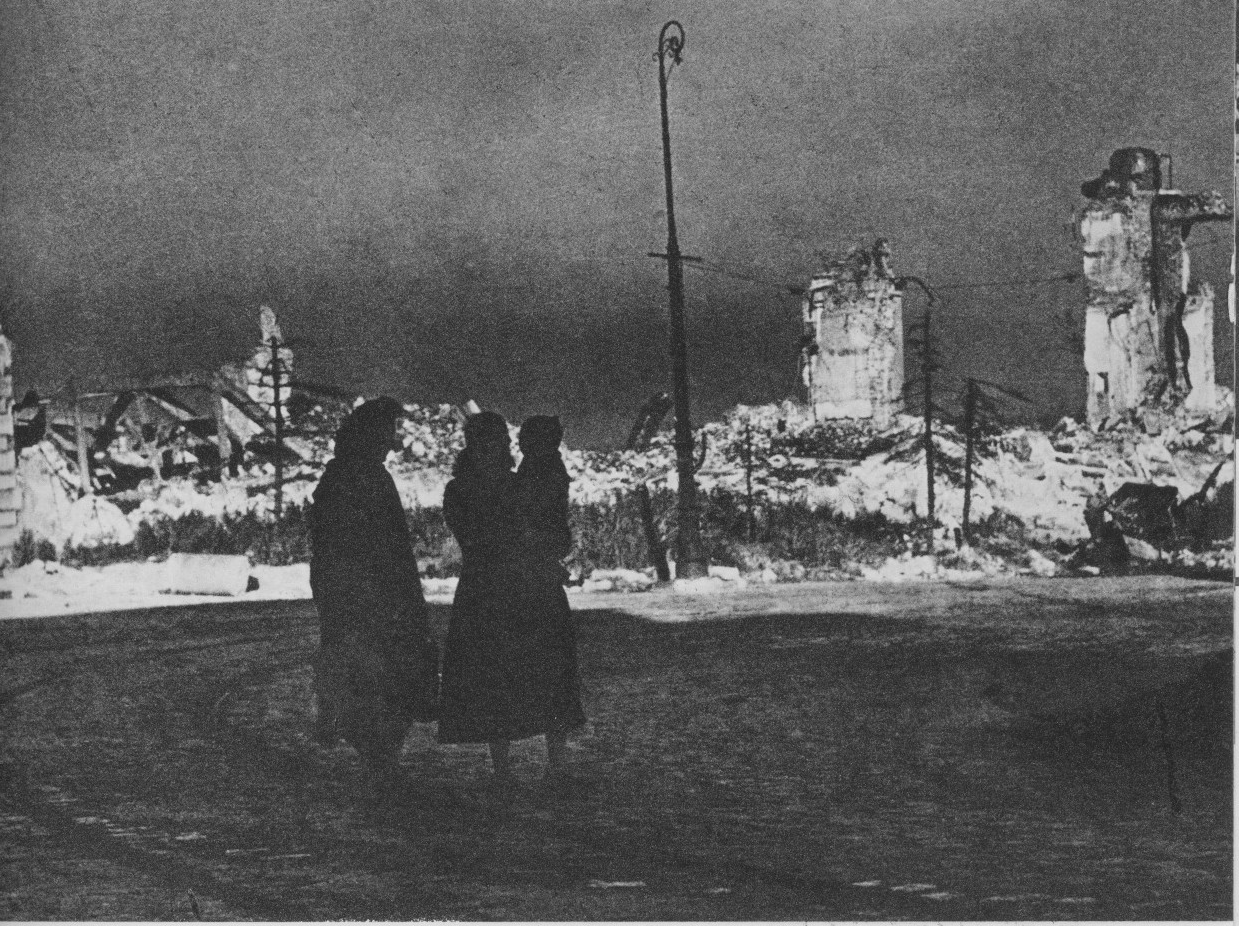
Castle Square destroyed during the German occupation of Poland (1939–1945) and the planned destruction of Warsaw, view in 1945

In 1949, the square was connected by an escalator to the newly formed Route W-Z (East-West Route), which runs under Castle Square through a tunnel; and the viaduct (leading to the Silesian-Dąbrowski Bridge) was built in the place of Pancer Viaduct, destroyed during World War II. In 1907, the viaduct was modernized to handle electric trams that went over there less than a year later.

This square has witnessed many dramatic scenes in Polish history. Patriotic demonstrations took place there during the period before the outbreak of the January uprising of 1863. On 27 February 1861, Russian bullets killed five people. On 8 April 1861, five rota of infantry and two troops of Russian cavalry (about 1,300 people) led by General Stepan Aleksandrovich Khrulyov carried out a bloody massacre of civilians, resulting in the deaths of more than 100 people.

During martial law on 3 May 1982, the square became the scene of the particularly brutal riot, with ZOMO police rushing through demonstrations.

== Events ==
The square is a hub for tourists and locals, who gather to watch street entertainers, participate in rallies, watch concerts and even engage in breakdancing. In 1997, at the Castle Square, US President Bill Clinton gave a speech welcoming Poland to membership in NATO. On March 26, 2022, President Joe Biden delivered a public speech in the courtyard of the Royal Castle, with crowds gathering in the square outside the castle.

Castle Square featured the United Buddy Bears exhibition in summer 2008 – an array of 140 two-metre-high sculptures, each designed by a different artist, touring the world as a symbol of cultural understanding, tolerance and mutual trust. According to official information, more than 1.5 million visitors were counted.

== Gallery ==
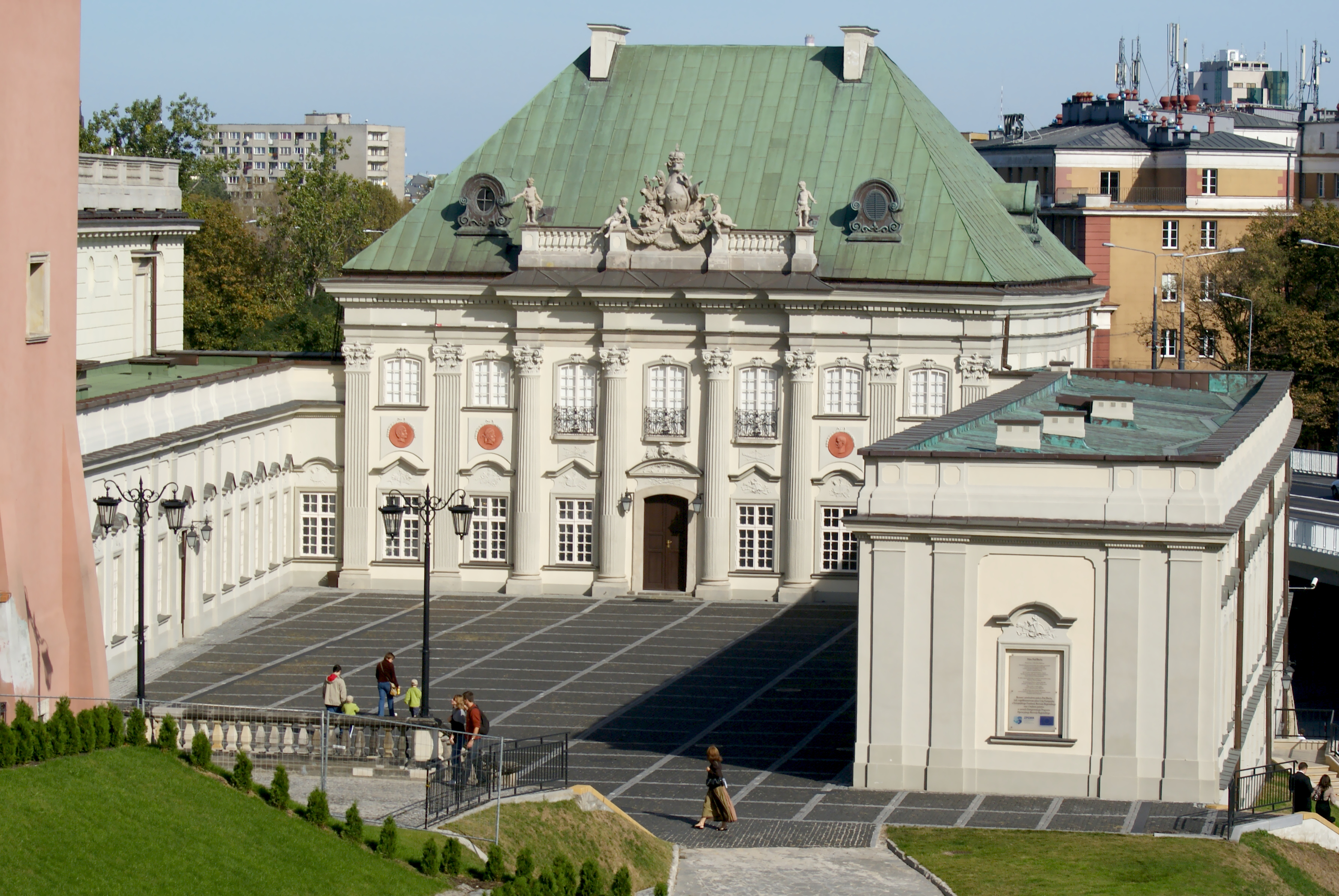
Copper-Roof Palace, Castle Square 2

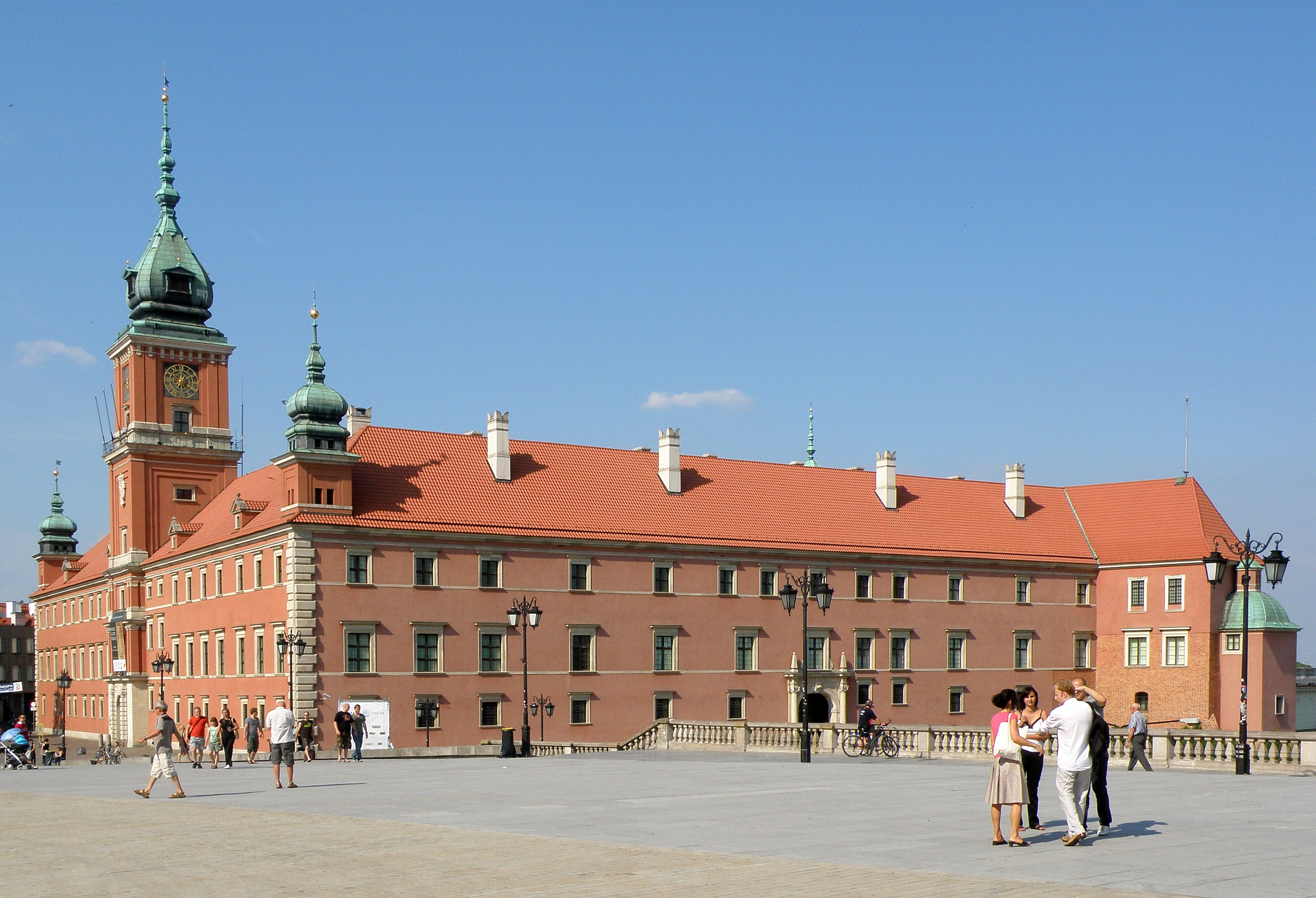
Royal Castle, Castle Square 4

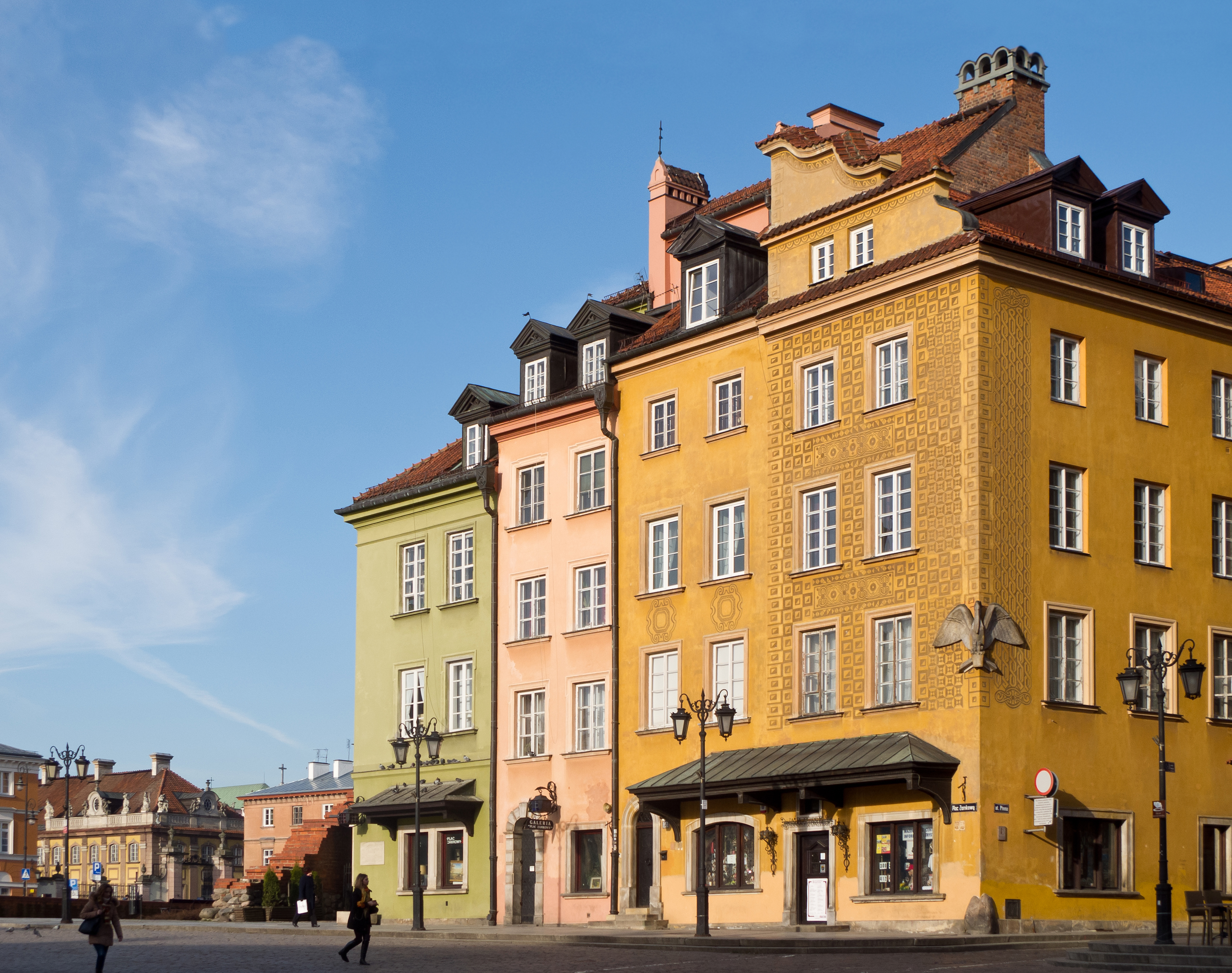
Castle Square 1/13 (9/11/13a/13b)

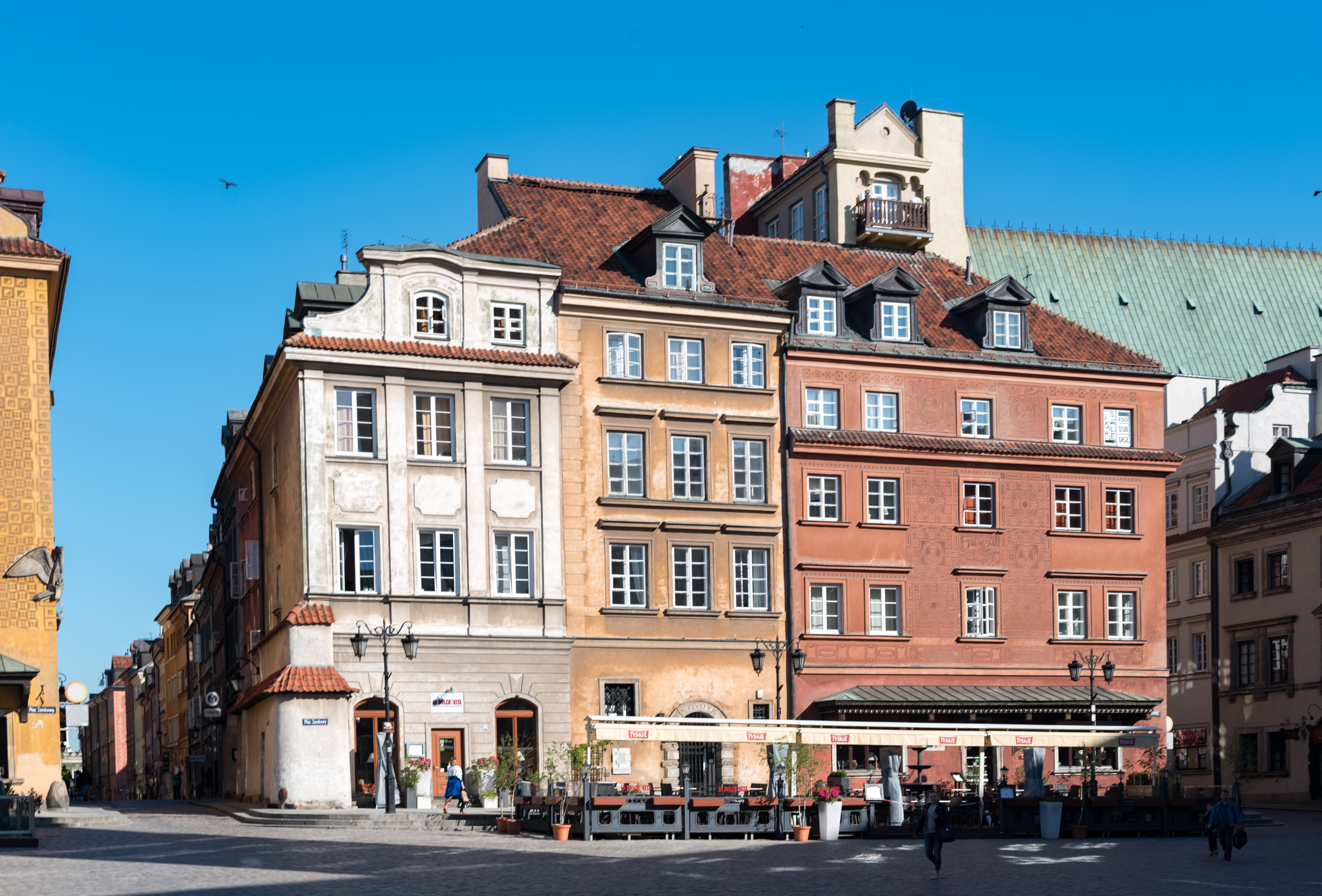
Castle Square 15/17/19

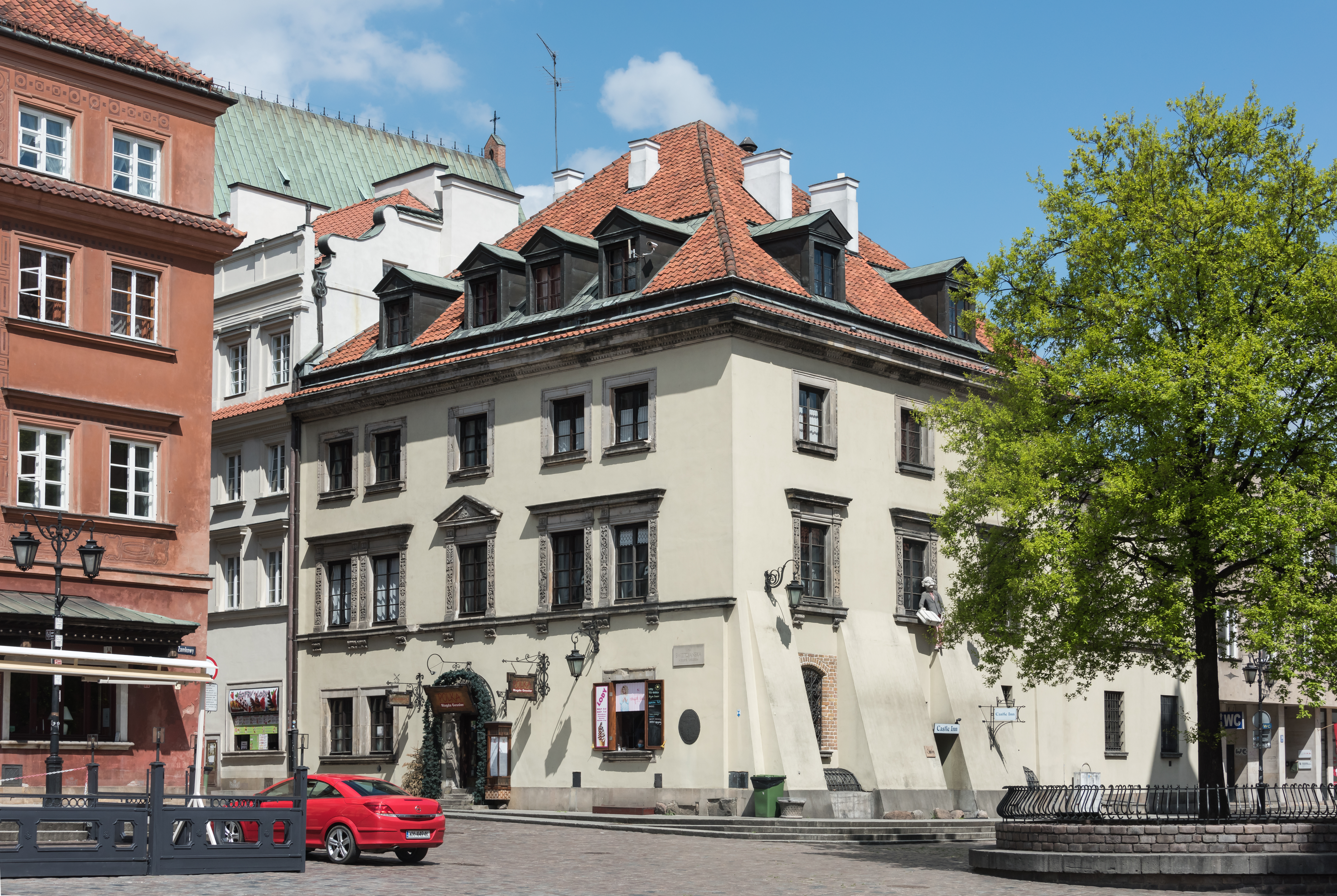
Mansjonaria House, Świętojańska Street 2

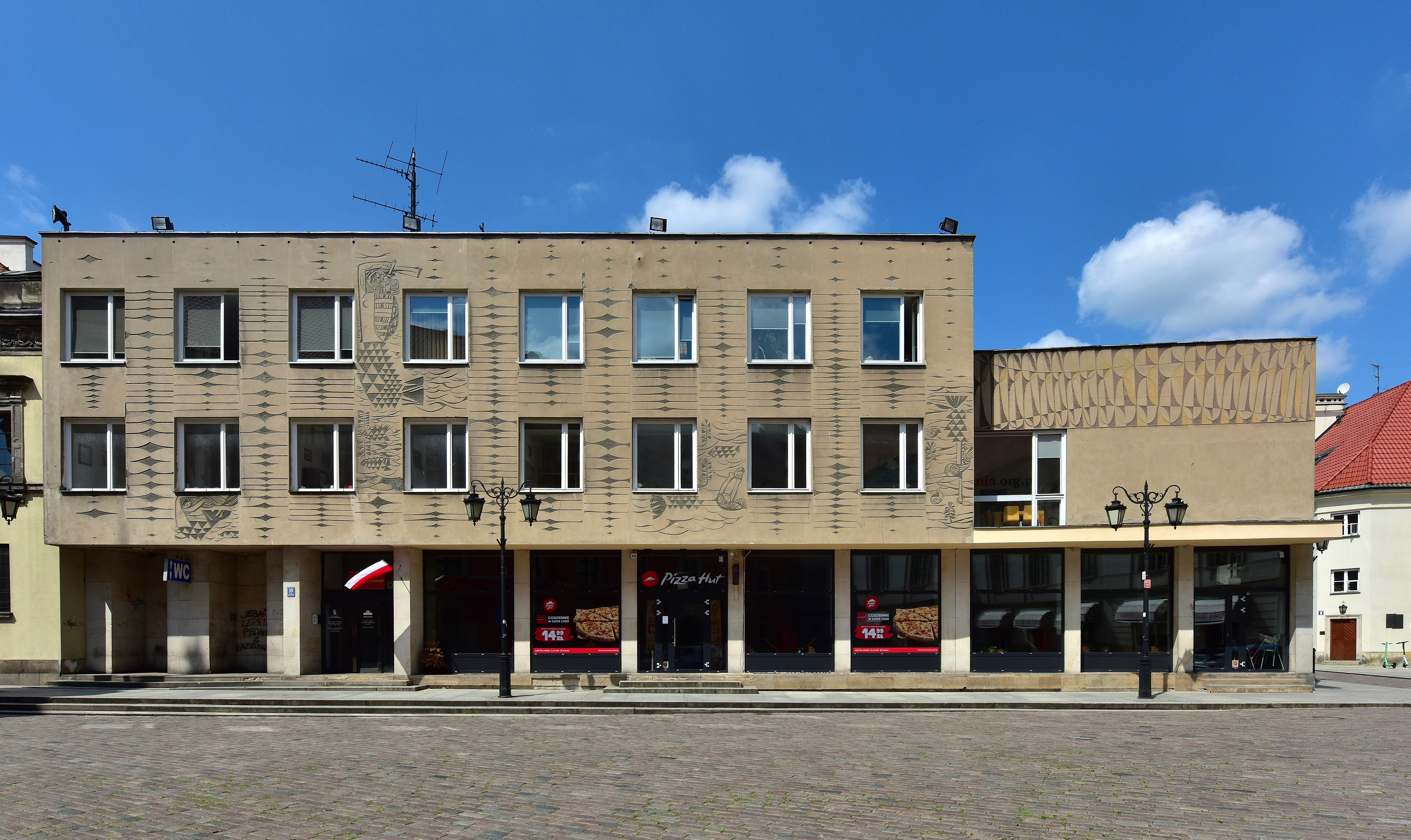
Warsaw Friends Association, Castle Square 10

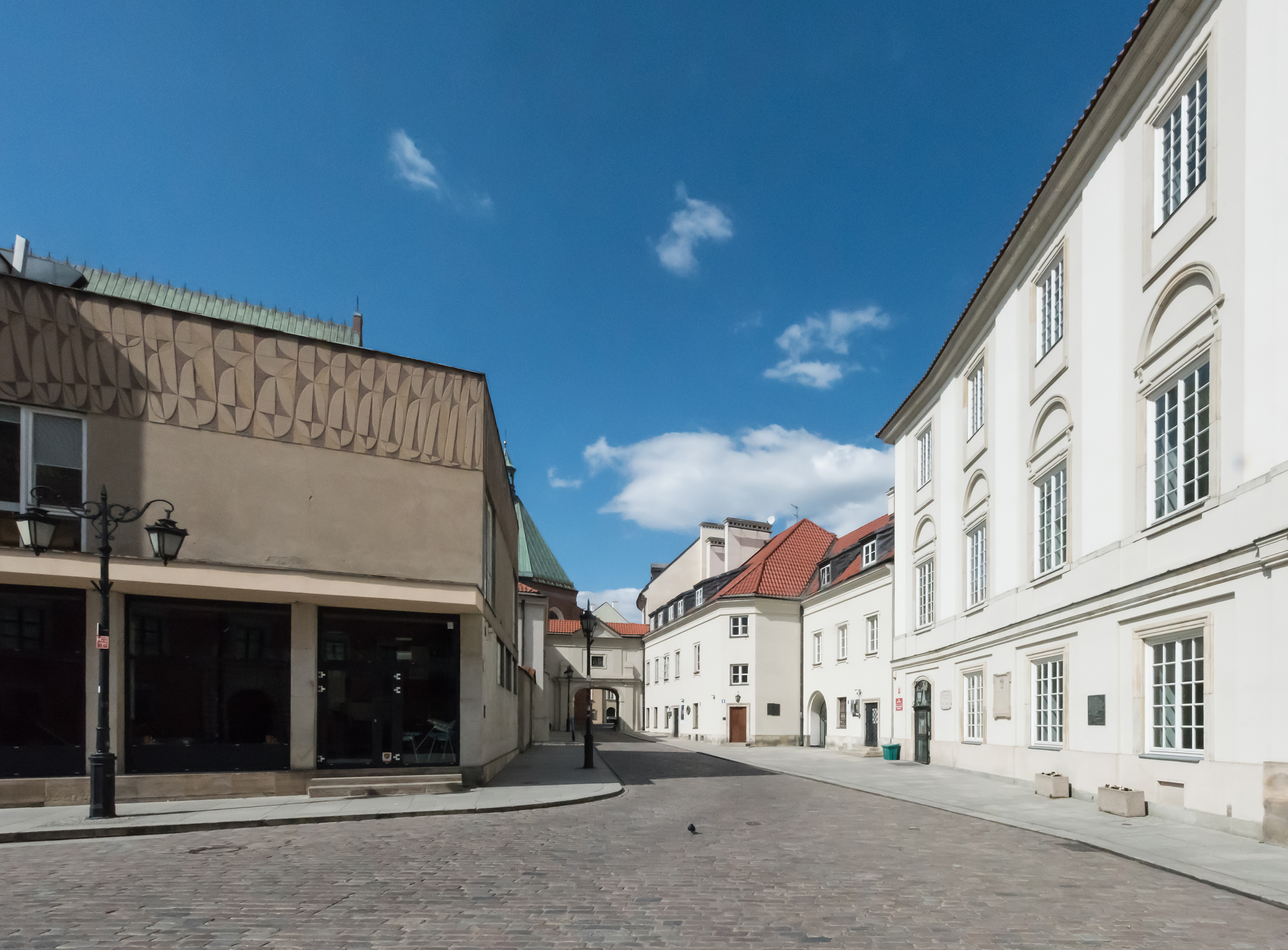
Castle Square 10 and 6/8 towards Kanonia Street

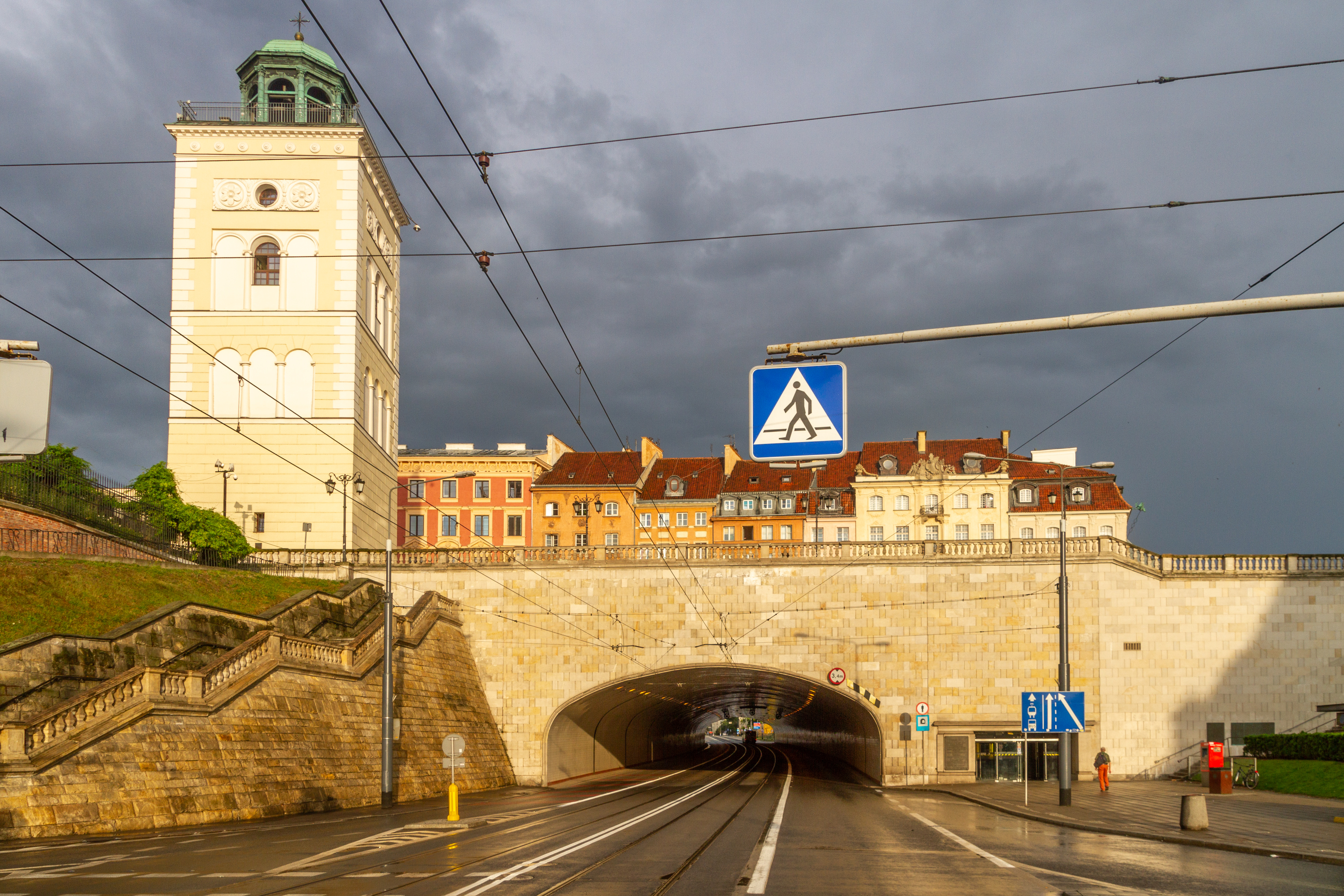
Tunnel under the square

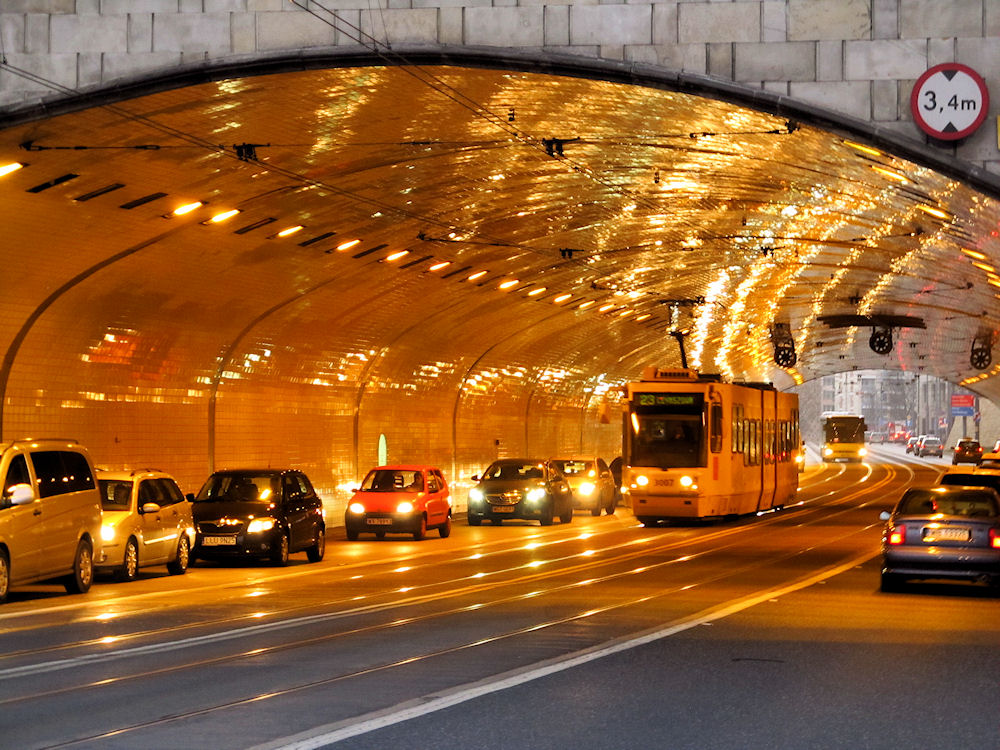
Tunnel under the square

=== Details ===
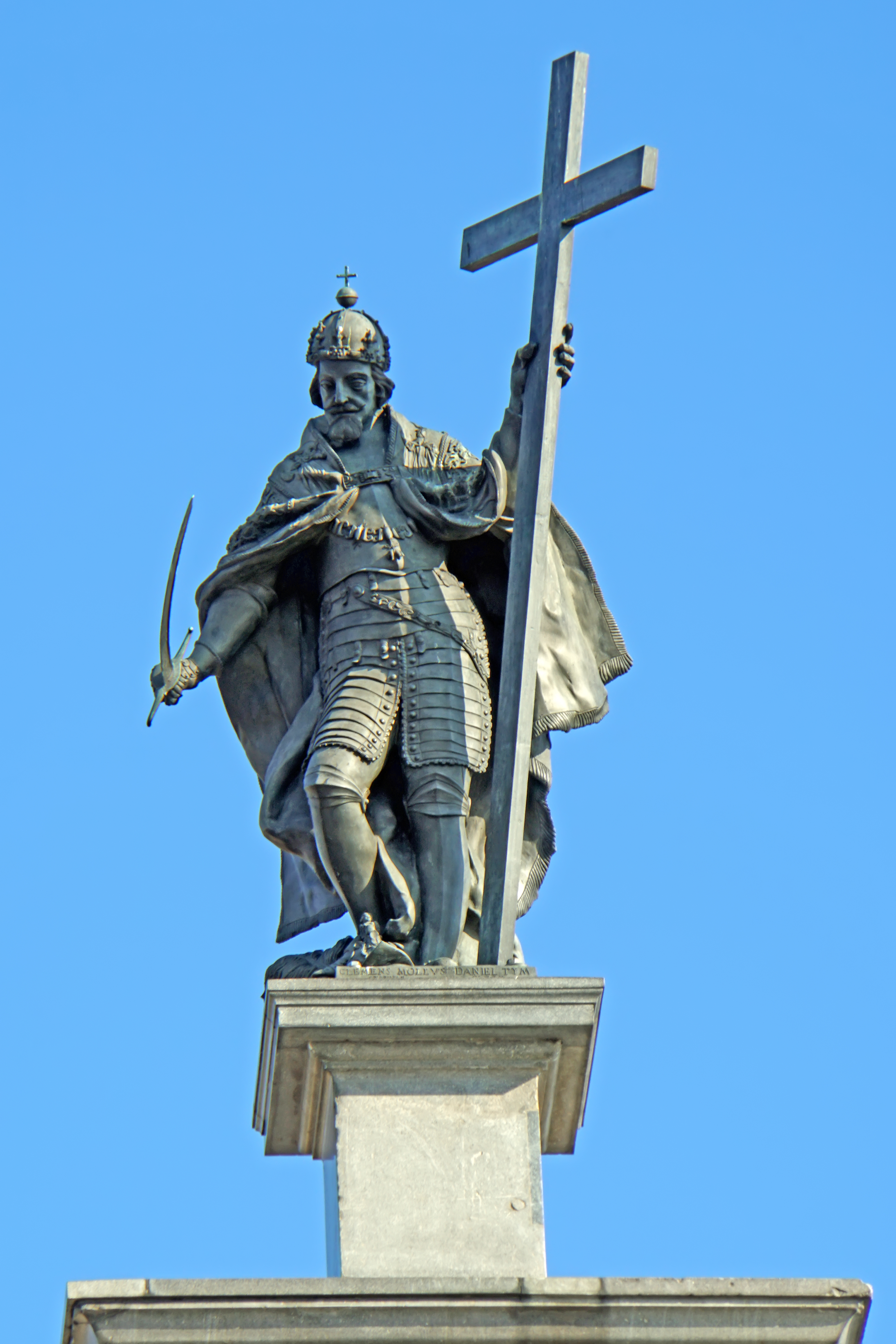
Sigismund's Column

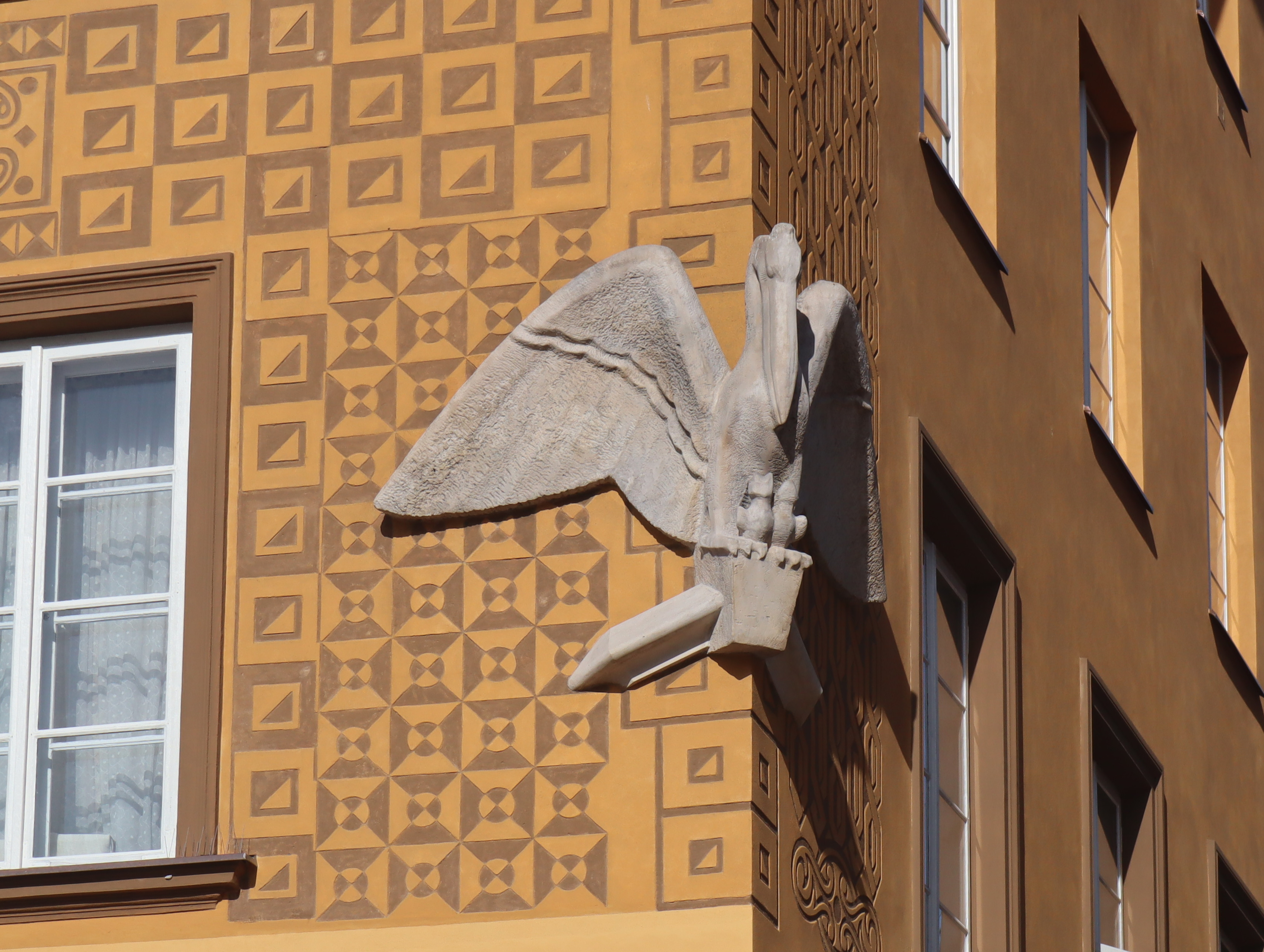
Pelican House, Castle Square 1/13

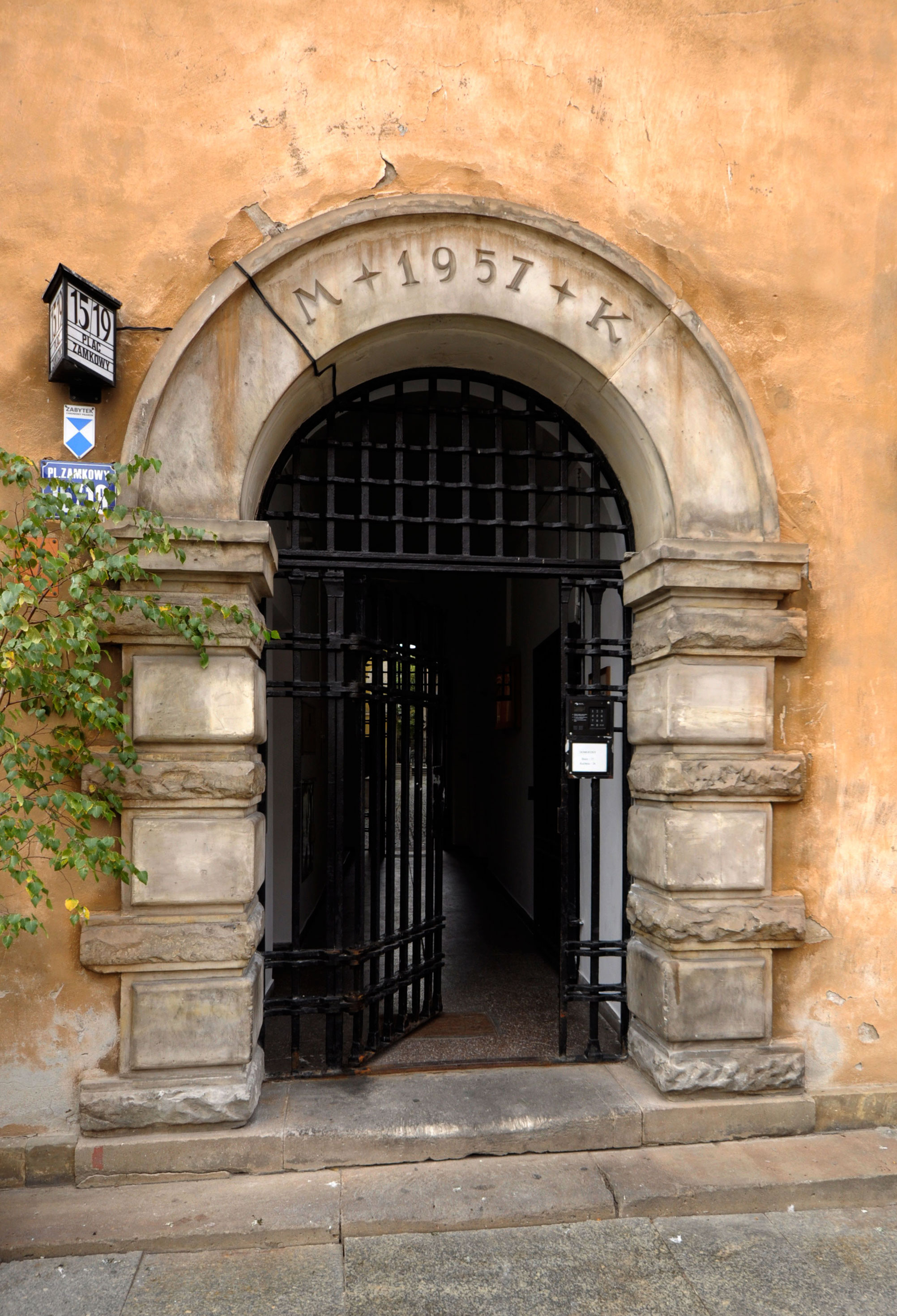
Castle Square 17

== See also ==
- Tourist attractions in Warsaw
- Aleksander John Tenement
- Prażmowski Tenement
