= Aleksander John Tenement =

Historic tenement house in Warsaw, Poland

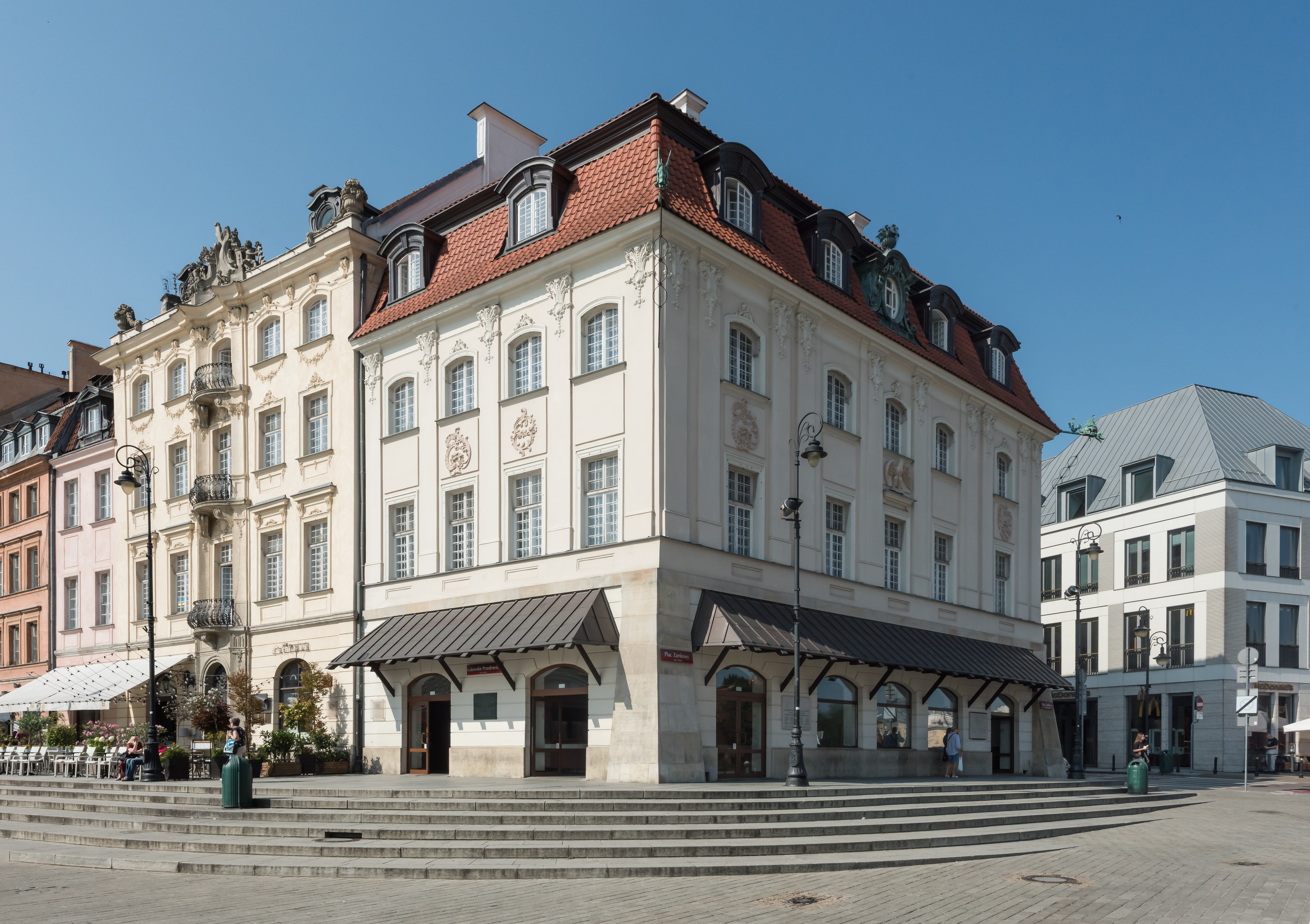
- The building in 2025
- Interactive map of the Aleksander John Tenement area

General information
- Type: Tenement house
- Architectural style: Baroque; Rococo
- Location: 89 Kraków Suburb Street, Downtown, Warsaw, Poland
- Coordinates: 52°14′49.15″N 21°00′47.01″E
- Completed: 17th century

Technical details
- Floor count: 4

Design and construction
- Architects: Jan Zygmunt Deybel (original building); Kazimierz Thor and Włodzimierz Wapiński (1950 reconstruction)
- Developer: Matiasz Brankiewicz

The Aleksander John Tenement (Polish pronunciation: [a.lɛkˈsan.dɛr ˈjɔn]; Polish: Kamienica Aleksandra Johna), also known as the Ignacy Nowicki Tenement (Polish pronunciation: [iɡˈna.t͡sɘ̟ nɔˈvit͡s.ki]; Polish: Kamienica Ignacego Nowickiego) is a Baroque and rococo four-storey tenement in Warsaw, Poland, located within the Old Town neighbourhood of the Downtown district. It is placed at 89 Kraków Suburb Street, next to the Castle Square. Its interior is shared with the neighbouring Prażmowski Tenement. It was designed by Jan Zygmunt Deybel, and constructed in the 17th century. It was destroyed in 1939 during the Second World War, and rebuilt in 1950. It is included on the voivodeship heritage list.

== History ==
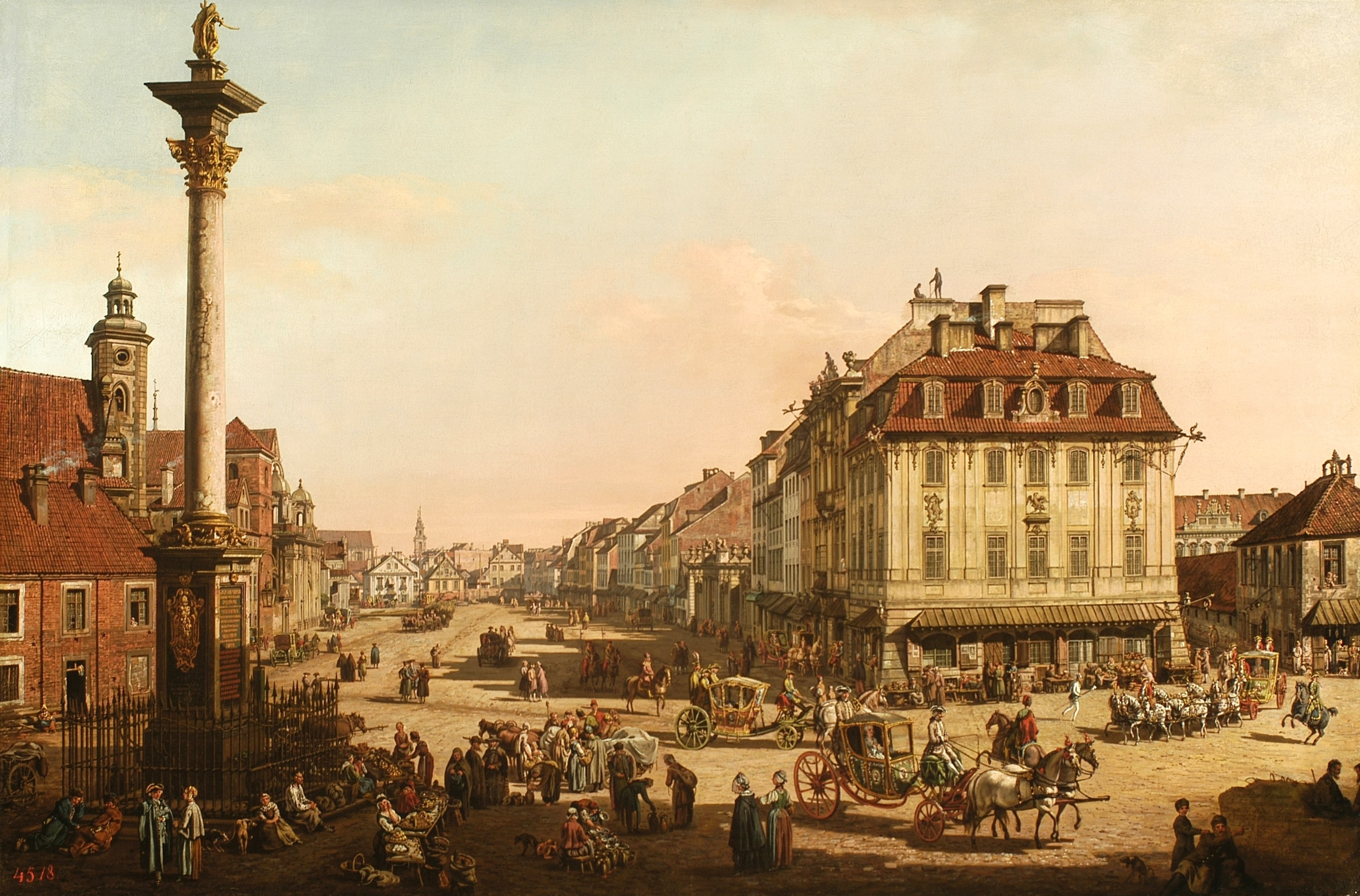
The Aleksander John Tenement depicted in the 1768 oil painting Cracow Suburb as seen from the Cracow Gate by Bernardo Bellotto.

The first tenement was built there in 1654 for musician Adamecki. It was destroyed, and rebuilt after 1669, for Matiasz Brankiewicz, which was later owned by A. Rojkiewicz in 1743. Around 1754, it was completely rebuilt with project by Jan Zygmunt Deybel, as a residence of royal notary Ignacy Ludwik Nowicki. It was a Baroque three-story tenement with a mansard roof with dormers and rococo ornamentations. In 1784, it was acquired by Henryk Münchenbeck, and housed his ironware warehouse. From 1790 to 1796, it housed a library and bookstore, owned by Fryderyk Chrystian Netta, and later in the 19th century, a julery warehouse owned by Aleksander Rothert. Between 1862 and 1863another storey was added to the structure, and in 1868, its façade was remodeled in electrical style.

In 1909, the building was bought by lawyer Aleksander John, father of graphic designer and illustrator Edmund John. In 1910, he hired Konrad Kłos to redesign its façade. In 1911, with the efforts of the Society of the Protection of the Heritage Buildings of the Past, it was restored to the previous rococo style.

The building was burned down in 1939, during the Siege of Warsaw in the Second World War, and was later completely destroyed in 1944. Its ruins were removed in 1947, during the construction of a tunnel of the East–West Route underneath them. The tenement was rebuilt in 1949, with design by Kazimierz Thor and Włodzimierz Wapiński, based on a 1768 oil painting Cracow Suburb as seen from the Cracow Gate by Bernardo Bellotto, which depicted the building. An escalator and operating it machinery were installed in the building, connecting the Castle Square with the East–West Route below. To accommodate them, the tenement was built 80 cm (2.22 ft.) wider than originally. Its inside was connected with the neighbouring Prażmowski Tenement. It was reopened in June 1950.

In 1965, the tenement house was entered into the voivodeship heritage list.

Currently, it houses the Polish Writers Association, the Polish Writers' Union, and the Polish division of PEN International.

== Architecture ==
It is a four-storey tenement with a mansard roof with dormers and rococo ornamentation. The building is conjoined with neighbouring Prażmowski Tenement, with which it shares the interior. At the ground level, it features an escalator and operating it machinery, which connects the Castle Square with the East–West Route below the building.
