= Prażmowski Tenement =

Historic tenement house in Warsaw, Poland

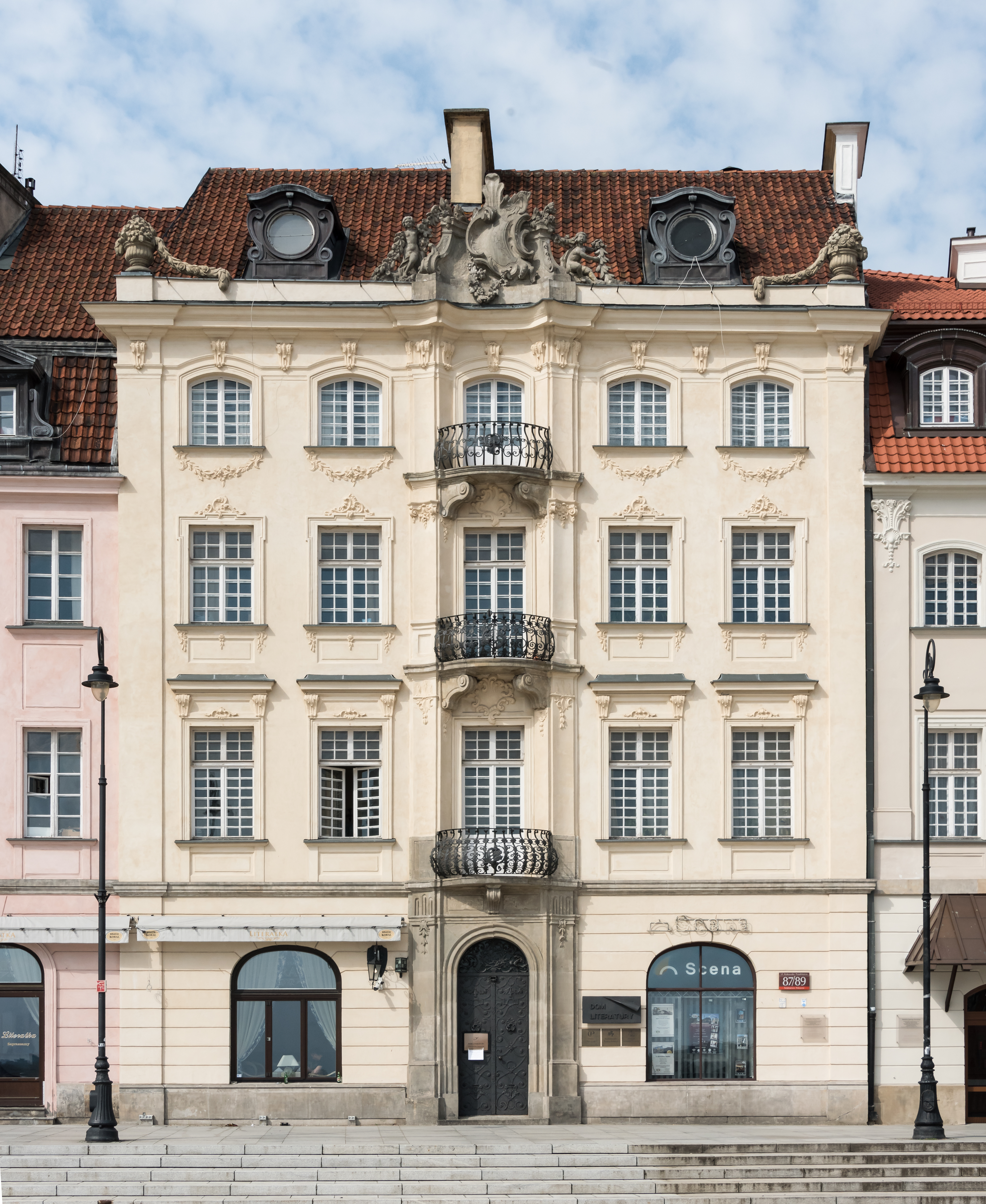
- The building in 2021.
- Interactive map of the Prażmowski Tenement area

General information
- Type: Tenement house
- Architectural style: Rococo, neoclassical
- Location: Downtown, Warsaw, Poland, 87 Kraków Suburb Street
- Coordinates: 52°14′48.67″N 21°00′47.37″E
- Completed: c. 1600

Technical details
- Floor count: 5

UNESCO World Heritage Site
- Type: Cultural
- Criteria: ii, vi
- Designated: 1980
- Part of: Historic Centre of Warsaw
- Reference no.: 30bis

Historic Monument of Poland
- Designated: 1994-09-08
- Part of: Warsaw – historic city center with the Royal Route and Wilanów
- Reference no.: M.P. 1994 nr 50 poz. 423

The Prażmowski Tenement, (Note: Polish pronunciation: [praʐˈmɔf.ski]; Polish: Kamienica Prażmowskich) also known as the Joachim Pastorius Tenement, (Note: Polish: Kamienica Joachima Pastoriusa) Leszczyński Tenement, (Note: Polish pronunciation: [lɛʂˈt͡ʂɘ̟ɲ.ski]; Polish: Kamienica Leszczyńskich) and Dobrycz Tenement, (Note: Polish pronunciation: [ˈdɔ.brɘ̟t͡ʂ]; Polish: Kamienica Dobrycza) is a historic tenement house in Warsaw, Poland, located at 87 Kraków Suburb Street, in the Old Town neighbourhood of the Downtown district. It was built around 1660. The building was destroyed during the Second World War and rebuilt in 1949. It is included on a heritage list.

== History ==
The tenement house was built around 1660 as the residence of the royal historian Joachim Pastorius de Hirtenberg. It originally was two-storeys tall, with four columns of windows. In the second half of the 17th century, it became a property of city councillor K. Walter, and in 1666, was acquired by Mikołaj Prażmowski, the Grand Chancellor of the Crown and Primate of Poland–Lithuania.

In 1754, after being purchased by the Leszczyński family, it was rebuilt in the rococo style, with a three-storeys and five columns of windows. The project was designed by Jakub Fontana. Sometime before 1795, on the other side of the building was buitlt an extension. Today, in its place stands the Samson Tenement, at 5 Senatorska Street.

Later, the building was inherited by the Rautenstrauch family, and in 1804, it was sold to merchant Stefan Dobrycz.

The building caught on fire in 1939 during the Siege of Warsaw. Its interior was destroyed in 1944, however, its façade survived the conflict with minor damage. The building was later partially deconstructed in 1948 during the works on the East–West Route tunnel underneath. The tenement house was rebuilt between 1948 and 1949, in accordance to the project by Zygmunt Stępiński, and was later renovated between 2002 and 2003.

In 1965, the tenement house was entered into the heritage list.

Currently, it houses seats of the Polish Writers Association, Polish Writers' Union, and the Polish division of PEN International.

== Architecture ==
The tenement house has four storeys and five columns of windows. Its façade mixes elements of rococo and neoclassical styles, being described with balconies with openwork balustrade, and a portal above the door, with crate feature the coat of arms of the Leszczyński family. The building is conjoined with neighbouring Aleksander John Tenement, with which it shares the interior.
