= Sigismund's Column =

Monument in Warsaw, Poland

- Kolumna Zygmunta
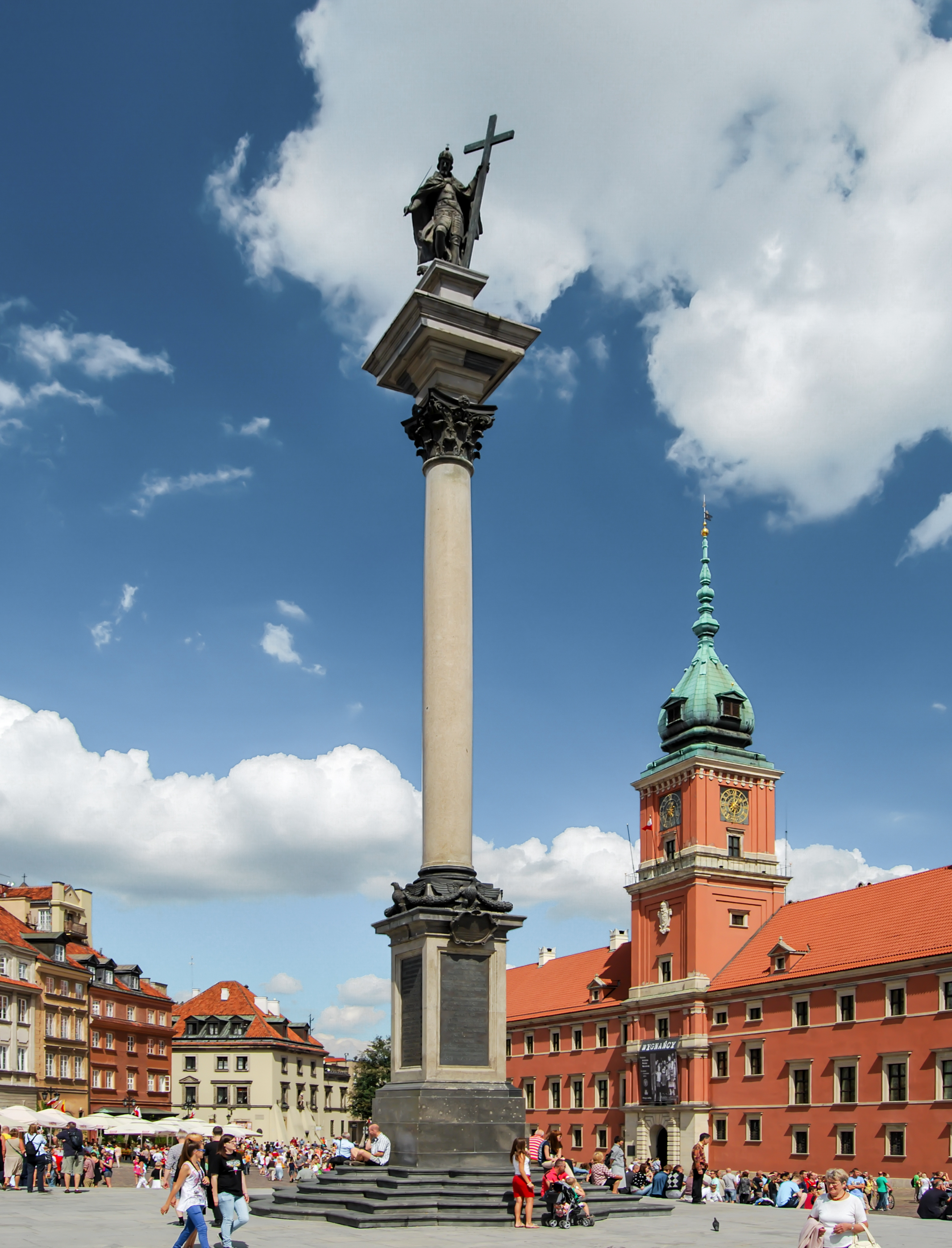
- Interactive map of Sigismund's Column
- Location: Warsaw, Poland
- Coordinates: 52°14′50.1″N 21°00′48.2″E
- Designer: Clemente Molli
- Material: Bronze, granite
- Completion date: 24 November 1644; 381 years ago
- Dedicated to: Sigismund III Vasa

UNESCO World Heritage Site
- Type: Cultural
- Criteria: ii, vi
- Designated: September 1-5, 1980
- Part of: Historic Centre of Warsaw
- Reference no.: 30bis

Historic Monument of Poland
- Designated: 8 September 1994
- Part of: Warsaw – historic city center with the Royal Route and Wilanów
- Reference no.: M.P. 1994 nr 50 poz. 423

Sigismund's Column (Polish: Kolumna Zygmunta), originally erected in 1644, is located at Castle Square, Warsaw, Poland and is one of Warsaw's most famous landmarks as well as the first secular monument in the form of a column in modern history. The column and statue commemorate King Sigismund III Vasa, who in 1596 had moved Poland's capital from Kraków to Warsaw. It is part of the Historic Centre of Warsaw, which was designated a UNESCO World Heritage Site on September 1-5, 1980.

On top of the Corinthian column's socle is a 2.75 m (9 ft) tall bronze sculpture of the king wearing armor, a coronation robe, a crown, and an Order of the Golden Fleece medallion across his chest; holding a Latin cross in his left hand and a sabre in his right hand; and placing his right foot on a helmet embellished with ostrich feathers. The Corinthian column formerly was made of red marble and was 8.5 m (28 ft) tall. It is now made of granite and adorned by 4 eagles.

== History ==
=== 17th century ===
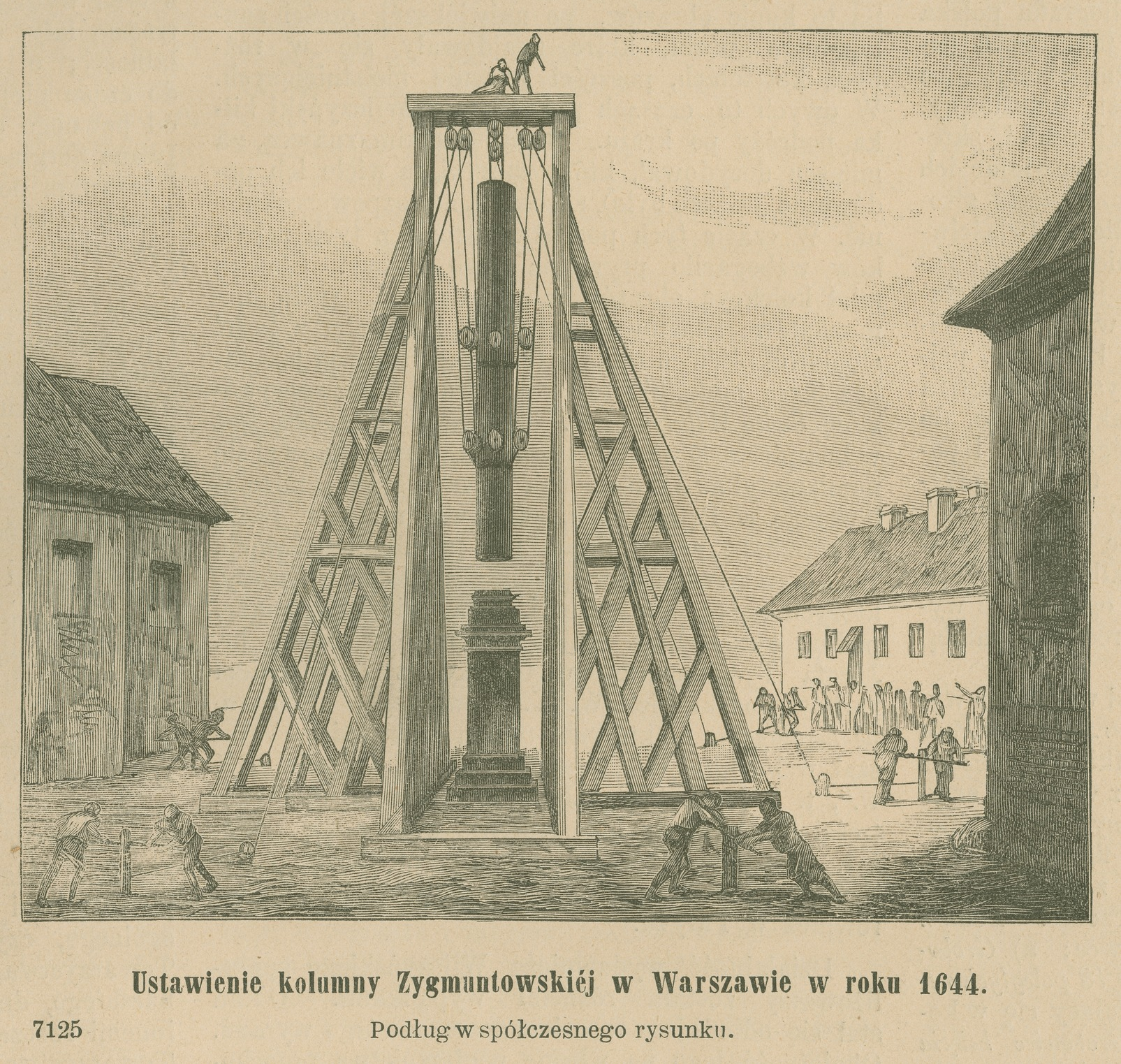
Construction of the Sigismund's Column, detail of the 1646 engraving by Willem Hondius

Erected between 1643 and 1644, the column was constructed on the orders of Sigismund's son and successor, King Władysław IV Vasa. It was designed by the Italian-born architect Constantino Tencalla and the sculptor Clemente Molli and was cast by Daniel Tym. Sigismund's Column was modelled on the Italian column-shaped monuments in front of Basilica di Santa Maria Maggiore, erected in 1614 to designs of Carlo Maderno, and on the Column of Phocas in Rome (Władysław Vasa had seen both of them during his visit to Rome in 1625).

The monument was supposed to symbolize royal virtues and to represent both the secular and sacral nature of royal power. The erection of the column primarily served political purposes as it glorified the House of Vasa and further strengthened the king's power and influence. That is why it was located at the square right in front of the Kraków Gate, the most important communication route of the capital at the time.

The column was ceremonially unveiled on 24 November 1644. It provoked a conflict between King Władysław IV and papal nuncio Mario Filonardi, who protested against the fact that the figure of a secular person was depicted on the monument. Traditionally, only the figures of Christ, the Virgin Mary, and saints could be revered in this way.

In 1681, the monument was surrounded with a wooden fence, which was later replaced with a permanent iron fence.

=== 18th and 19th centuries ===
The marble column itself was renovated several times in the next few centuries, most notably in 1743, 1810, 1821 and 1828. In 1854, the monument was surrounded with a fountain featuring marble tritons sculpted by the German, August Kiss.

In 1863, the column was renovated again under the supervision of architect Józef Orłowski. The monument still needed work, and between 1885 and 1887, it was replaced with a new column of granite. Between 1927 and 1930, the monument was again renovated and was restored to its original appearance when the fountain and the fence around it were removed.

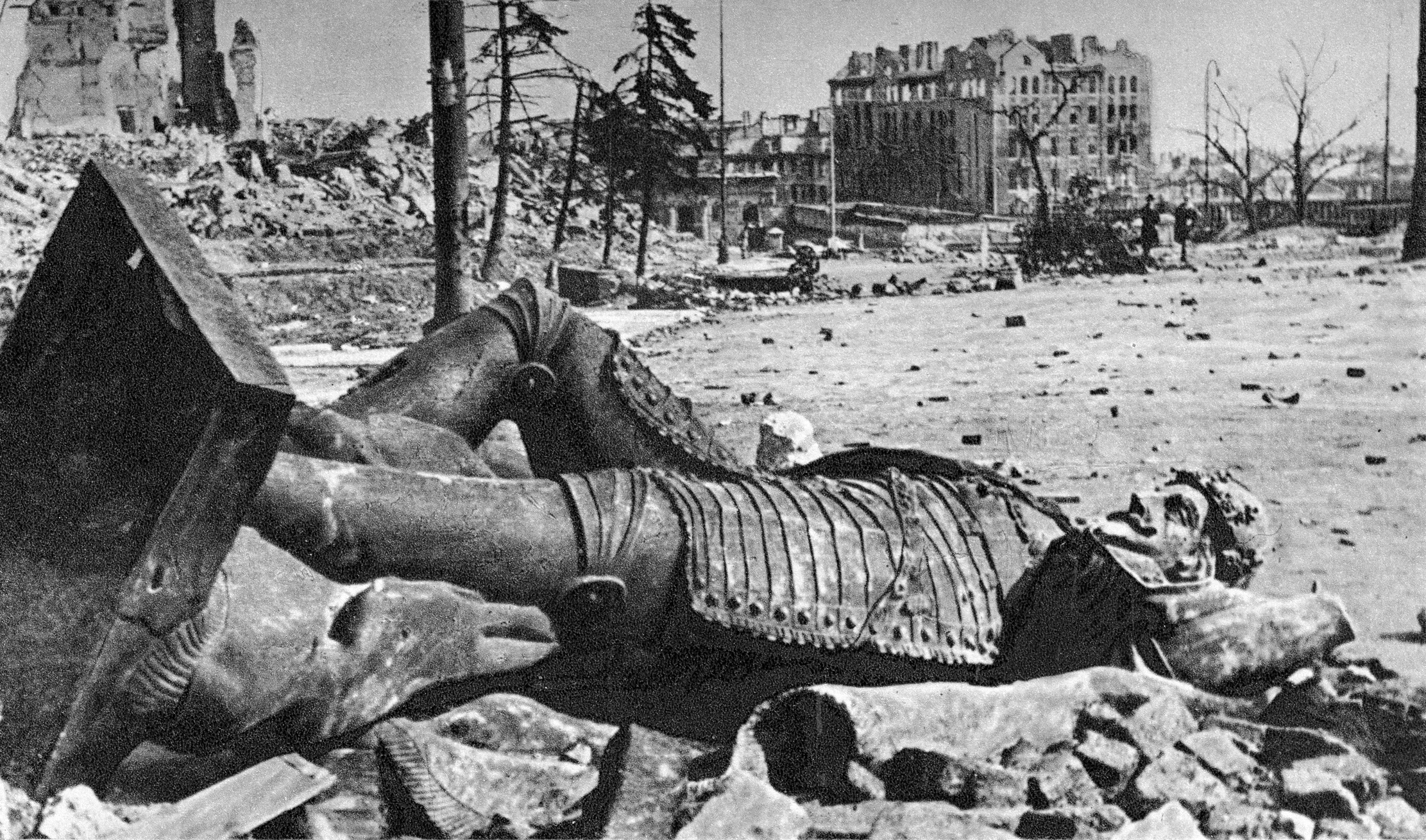
Toppled statue, 1945

=== 20th century ===
On 1 September 1944, during the Warsaw Uprising, the monument's column was demolished by the Germans, and its bronze statue was badly damaged. The damaged statue was transported on a sleigh to St. Anne's Church. In the spring of 1945, it was displayed at the National Museum in Warsaw in an exhibition titled Warsaw Accuses (Polish: Warszawa oskarża).

In 1945, Henryk Golański established a special committee whose objective was to restore the monument. The statue was eventually repaired, and in 1949, it was set up on a new column, made of granite from the Strzegom mine, a couple of metres from the original site. The original red marble (1644-1887) & damaged granite (1887-1944) Corinthian column segments are laying horizontal at the southwest corner of the Royal Castle and 180 feet east of the current column. In 1965, the column was officially inscribed on the country's register of historical monuments. In the same year, the column was depicted on a 10-zloty commemorative coin issued by the National Bank of Poland on the 700th anniversary of Warsaw.

== The inscription ==
On the side of the pedestal facing the Krakowskie Przedmieście is a plaque bearing these words in the finest lettering:

HONORI·ET·PIETATI

SACRAM STATVAM HANC SIGISMVNDO III VLADISLAVS IV NATURA AMORE GENIO FILIVS
ELECTIONE SERIE FELICITATE SVCCESSOR
VOTO ANIMO CVLTV GRATVS
PATRI PATRIAE PARENTI OPT MER ANNO DNI MDCXLIII PONI IVSSIT CVI IAM
GLORIA TROPHEVM POSTERITAS GRATITVDINEM
AETERNITAS MONVMENTVM POSVIT AVT DEBET

The inscription on the bronze plate of the column:

"King Sigismund III, by virtue of free election King of Poland, by virtue of inheritance, succession and law - King of Sweden, in love of peace and fame the first among kings, in war and victories not inferior to anyone, took prisoners of Tsar and Moscow chiefs, he conquered the capital and lands [of Moscow], defeated the Russian army, regained Smolensk, broke the power of Turkey near Khotyn, ruled for forty-four years, in the forty-fourth king"

== Gallery ==
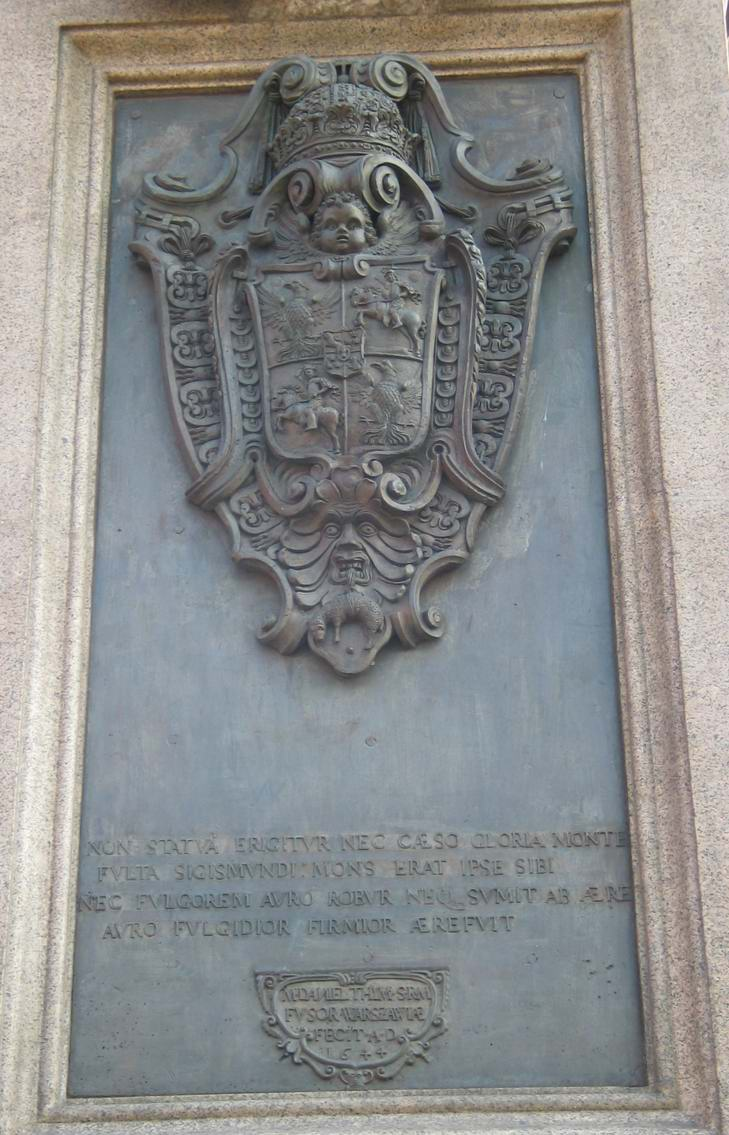

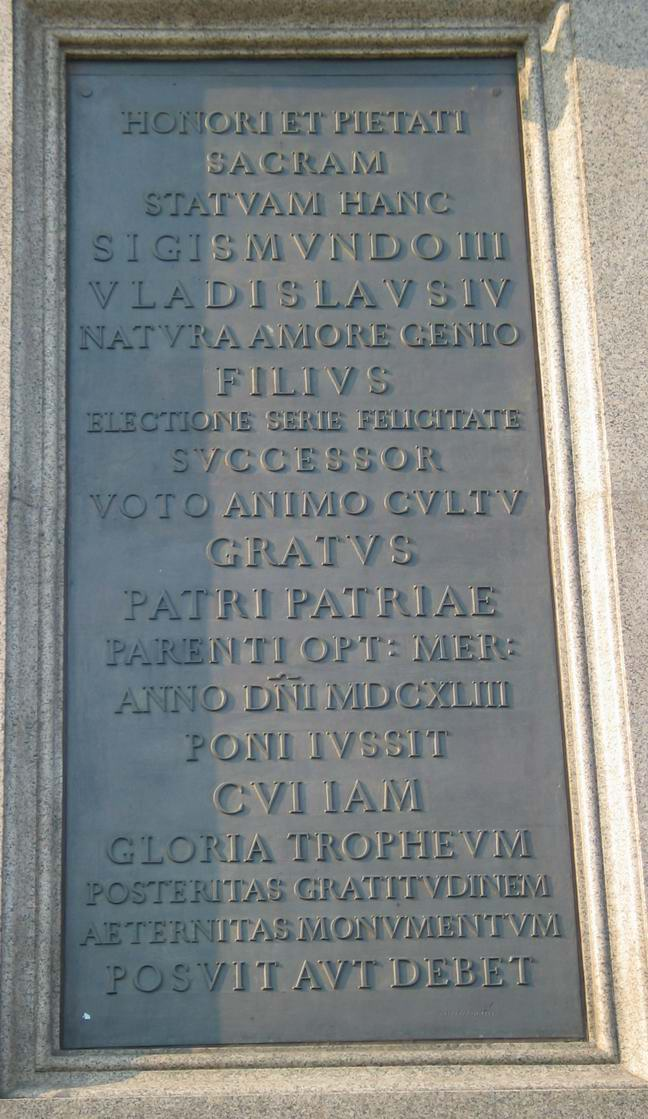

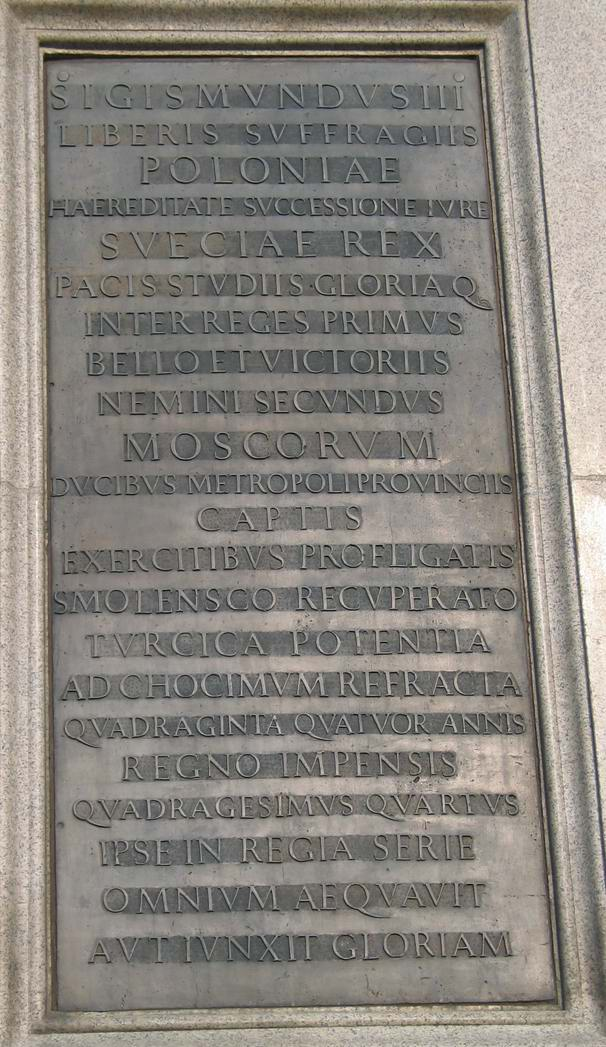

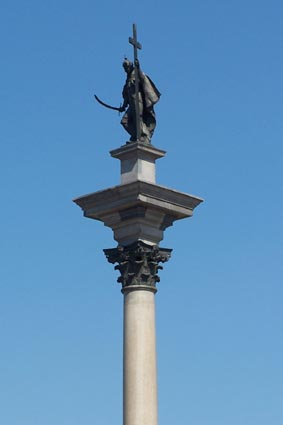

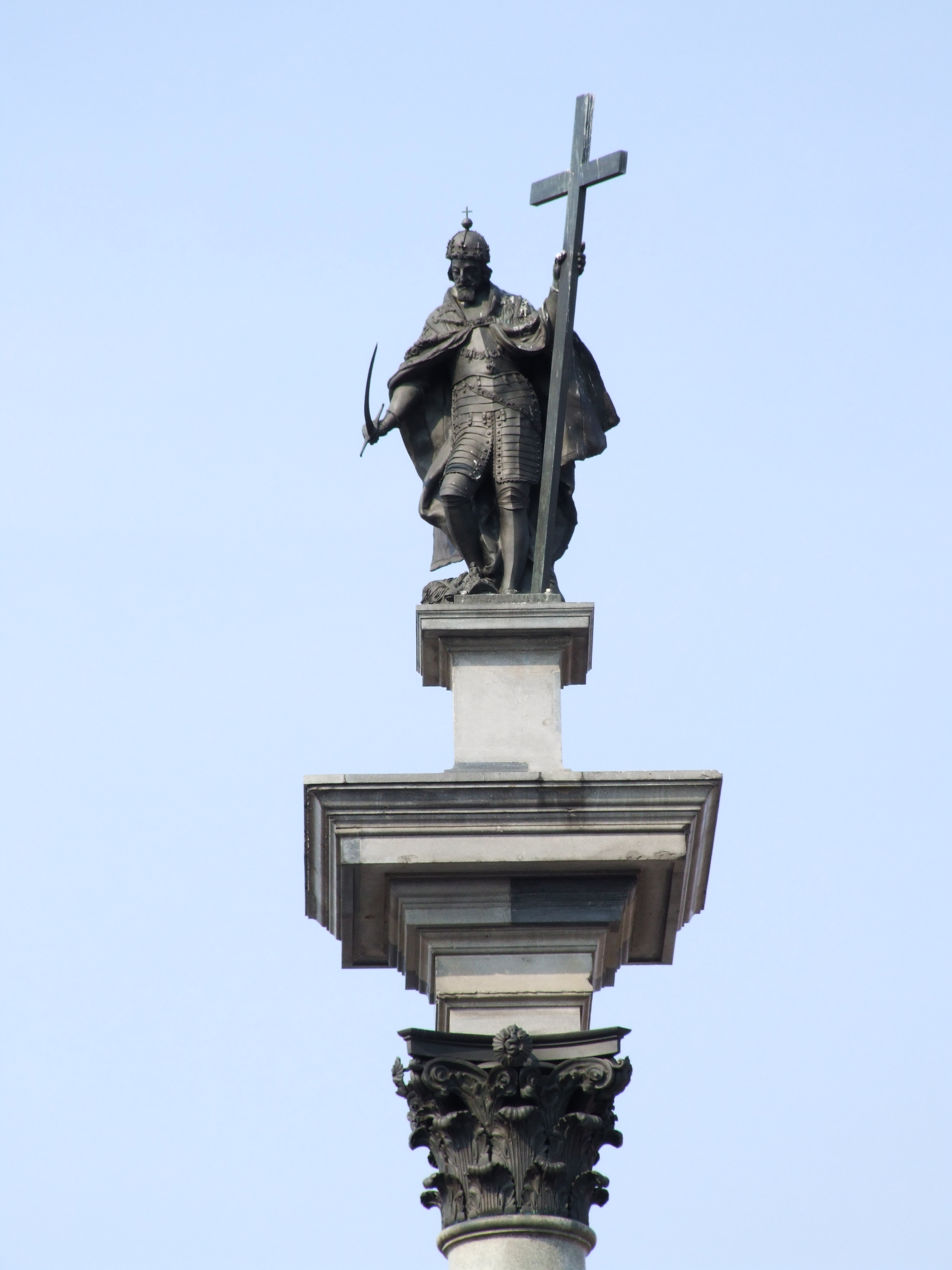

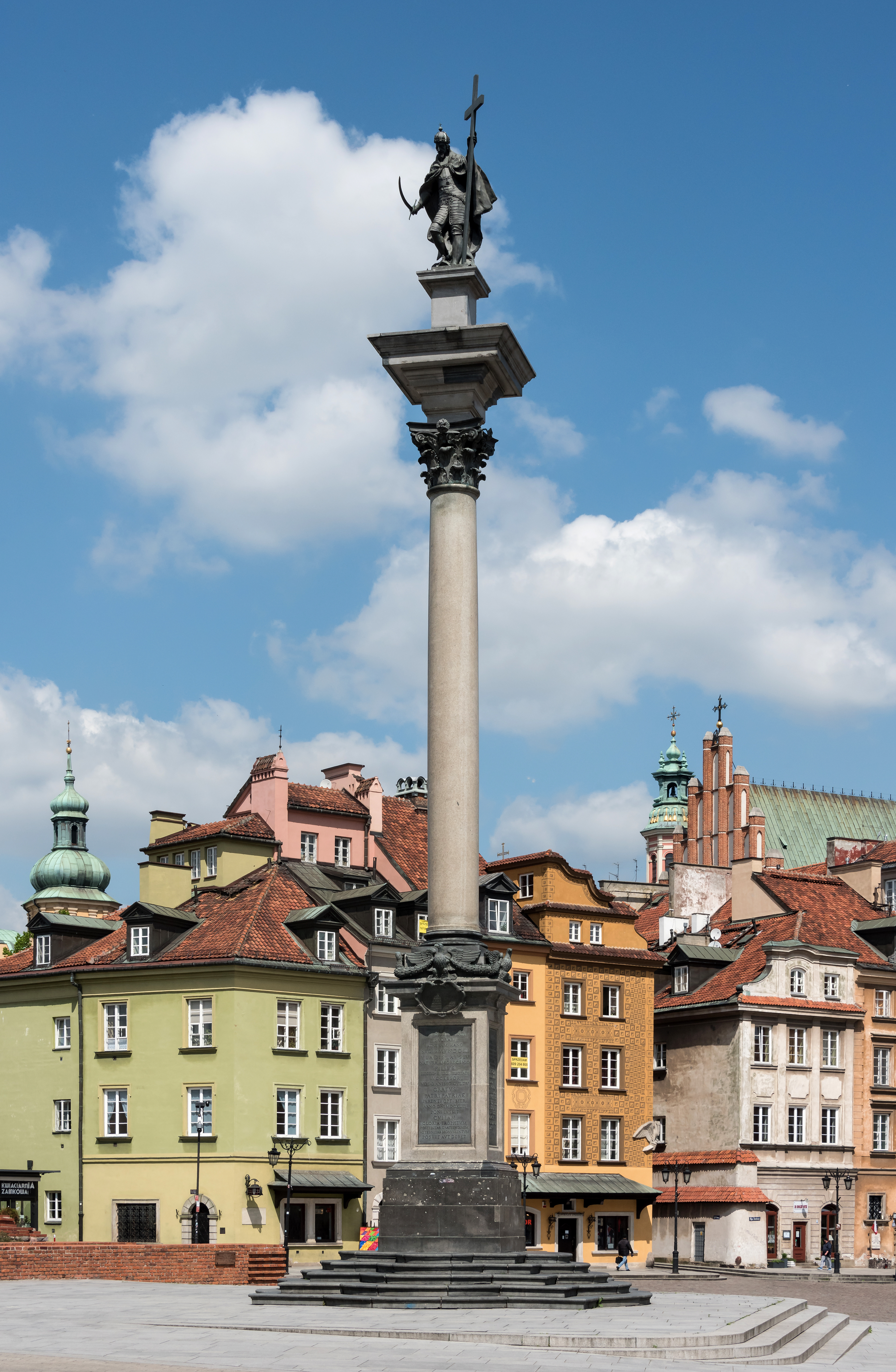

=== Original ===
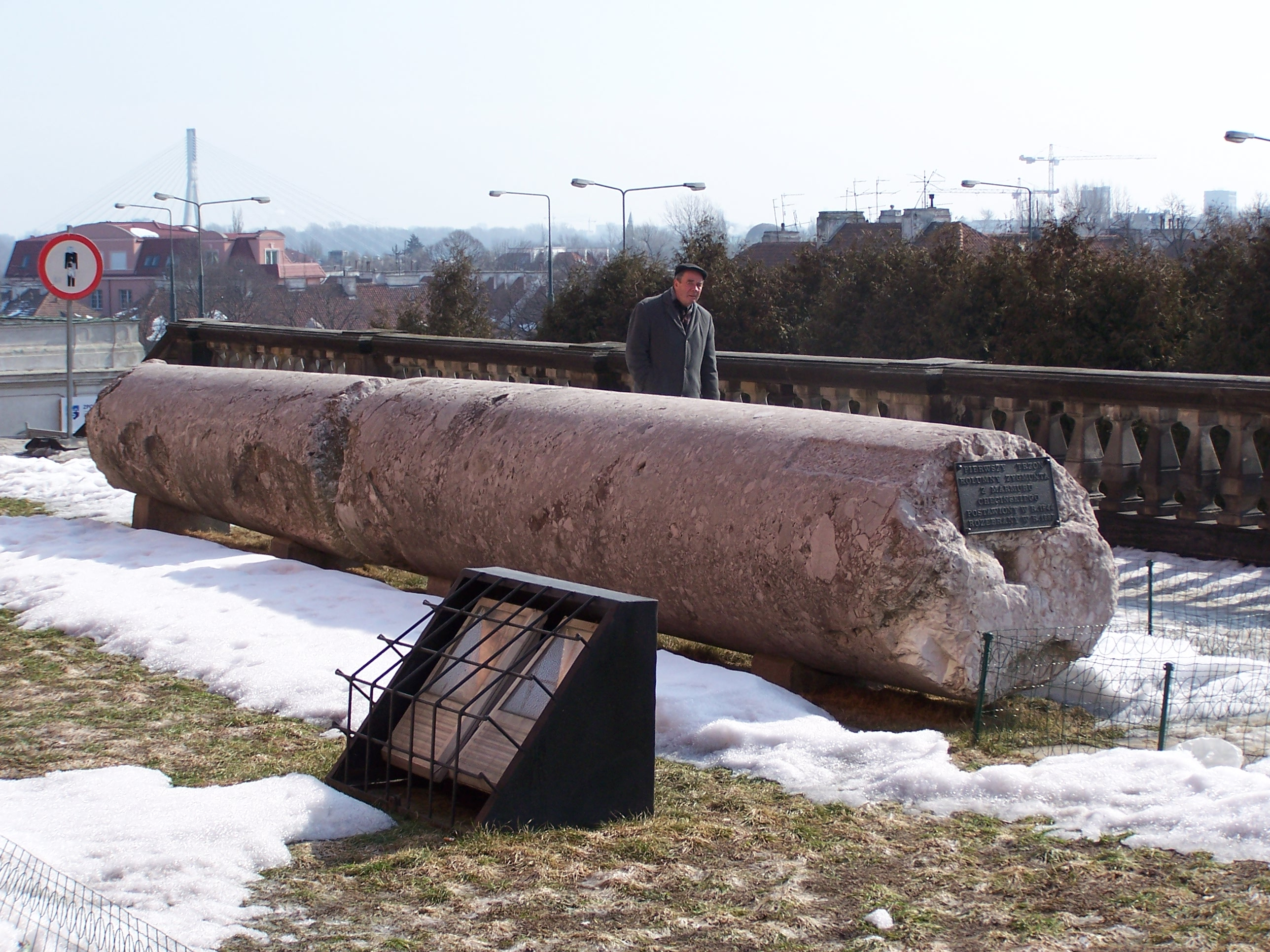
1644–1887

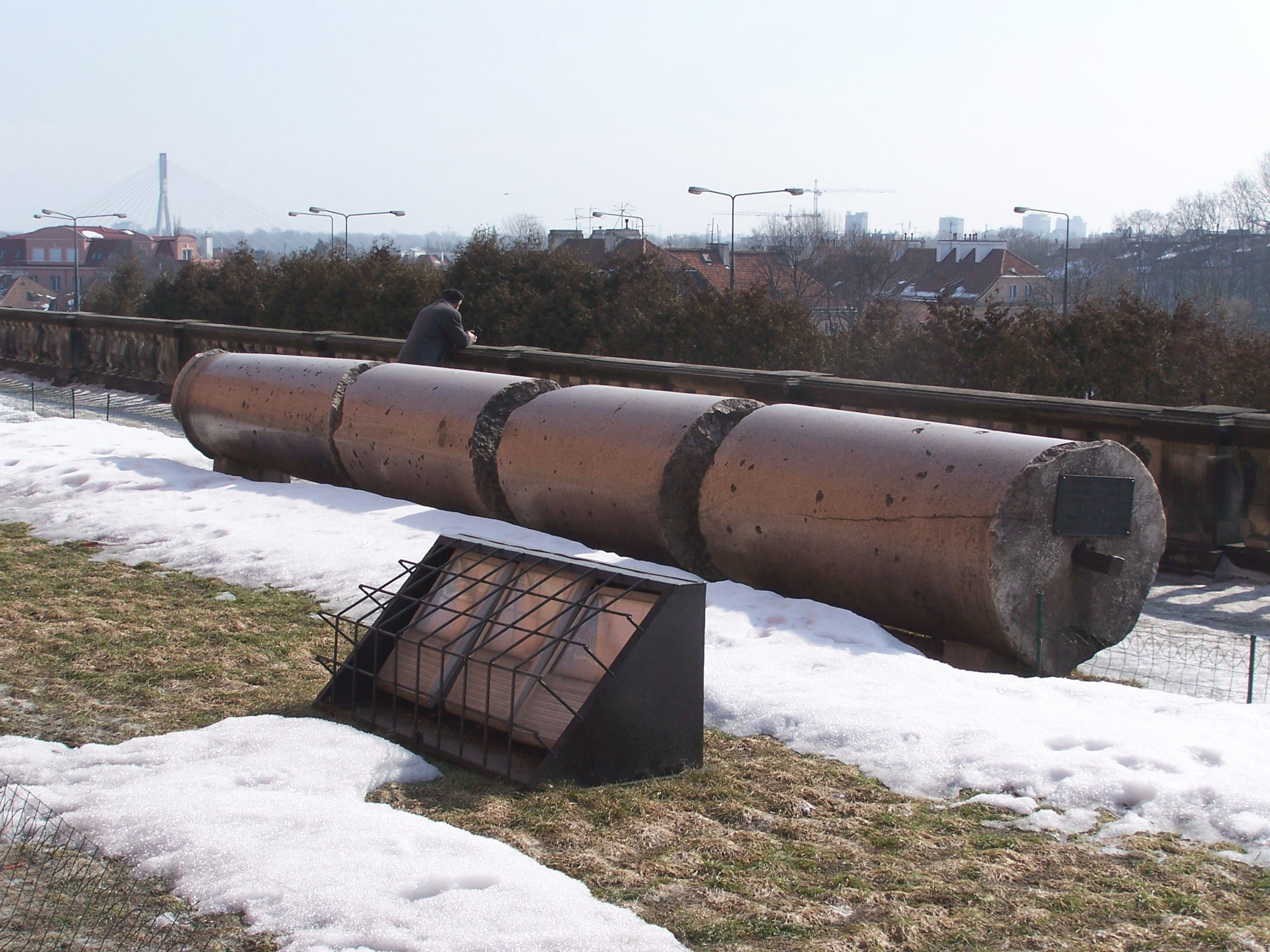
1887–1944

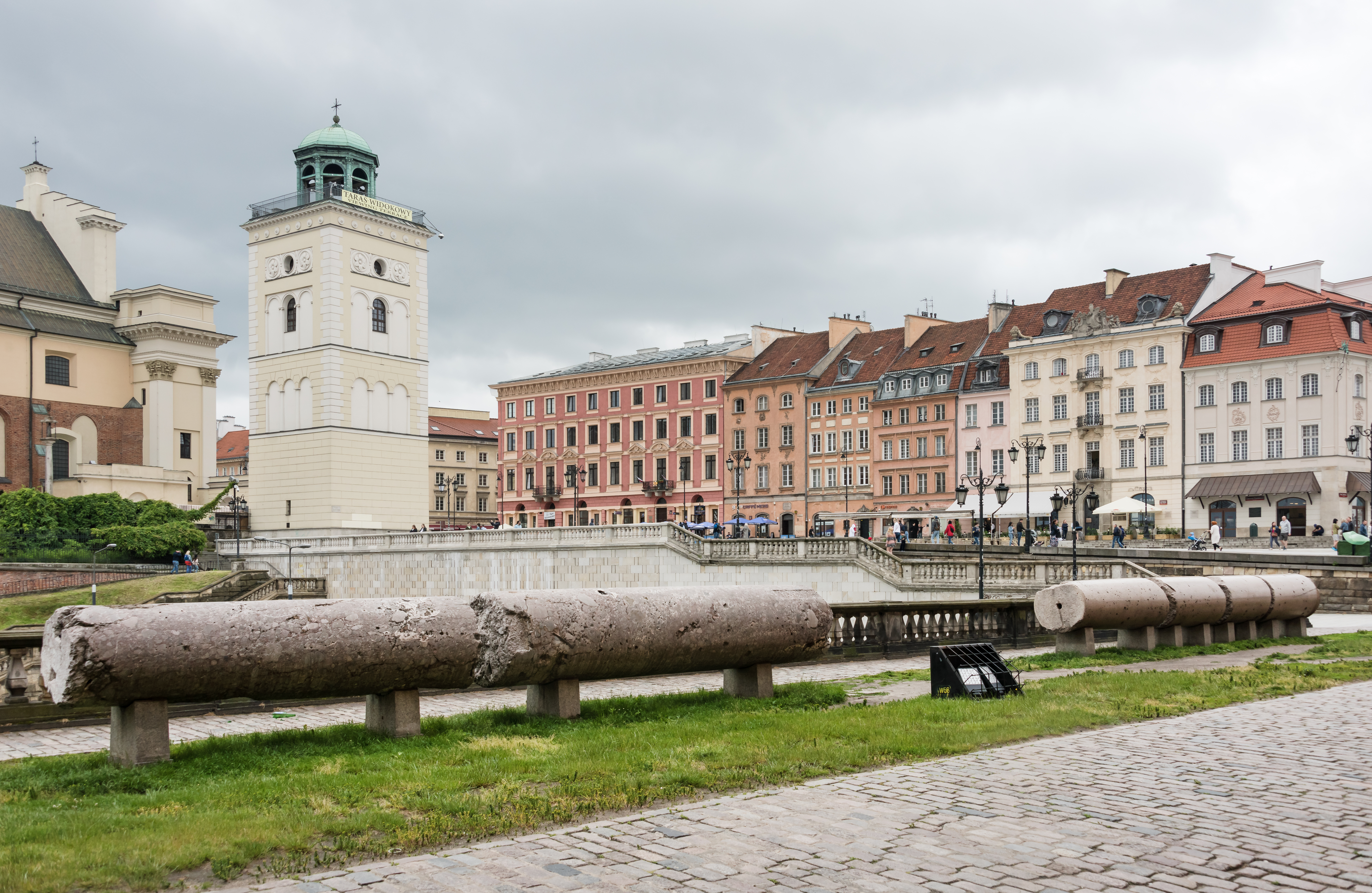
Both pieces of the column in 2021

=== 18th century ===
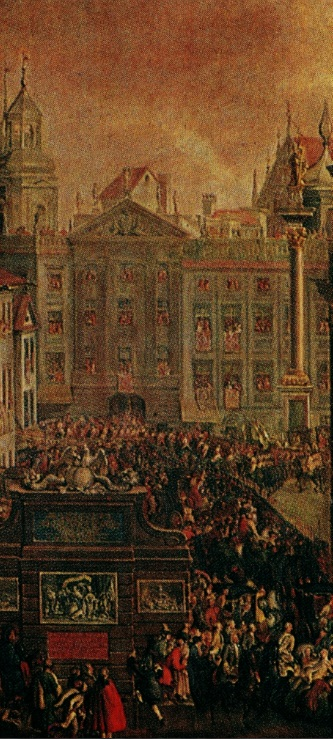

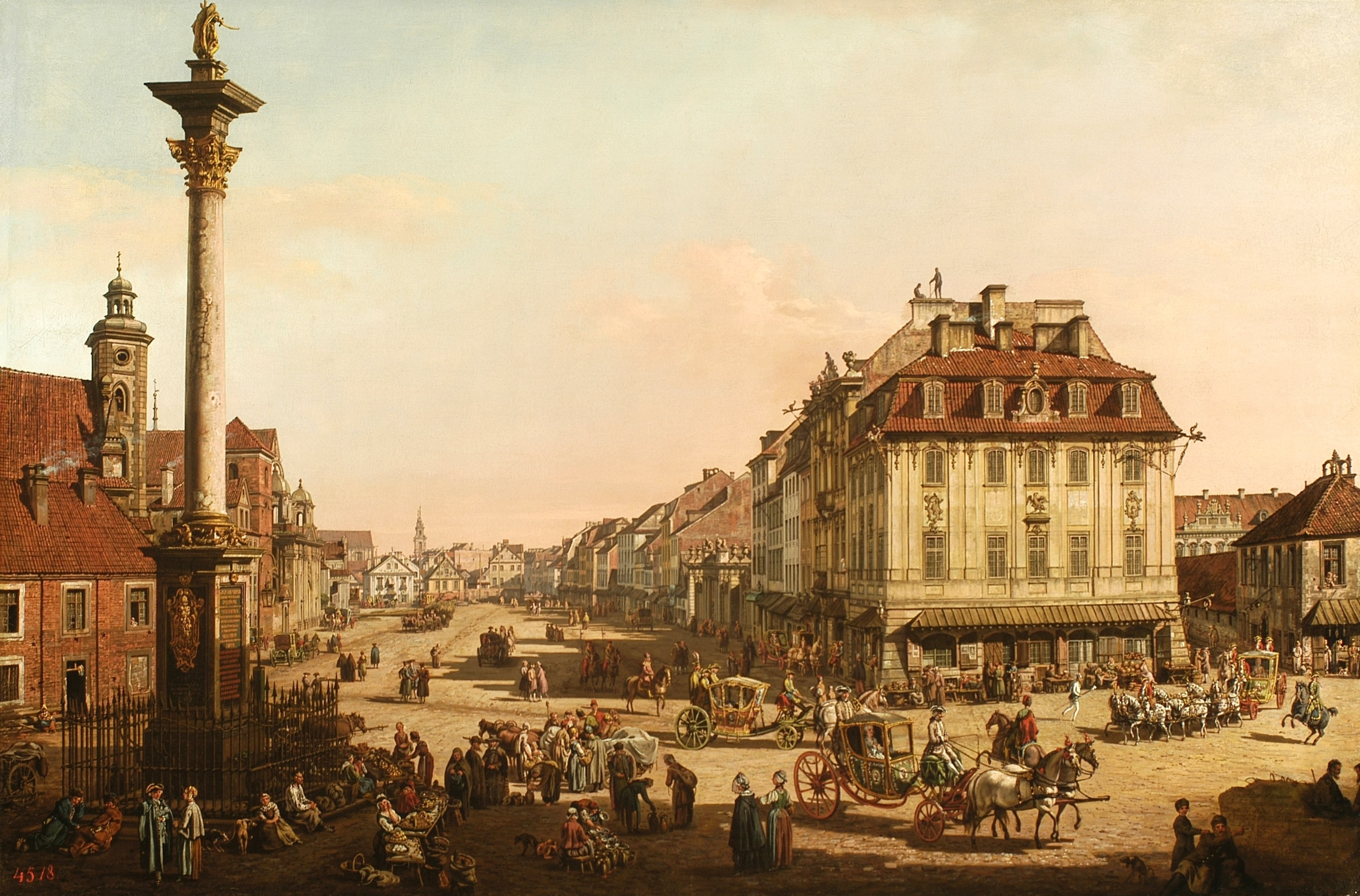

=== 20th century ===
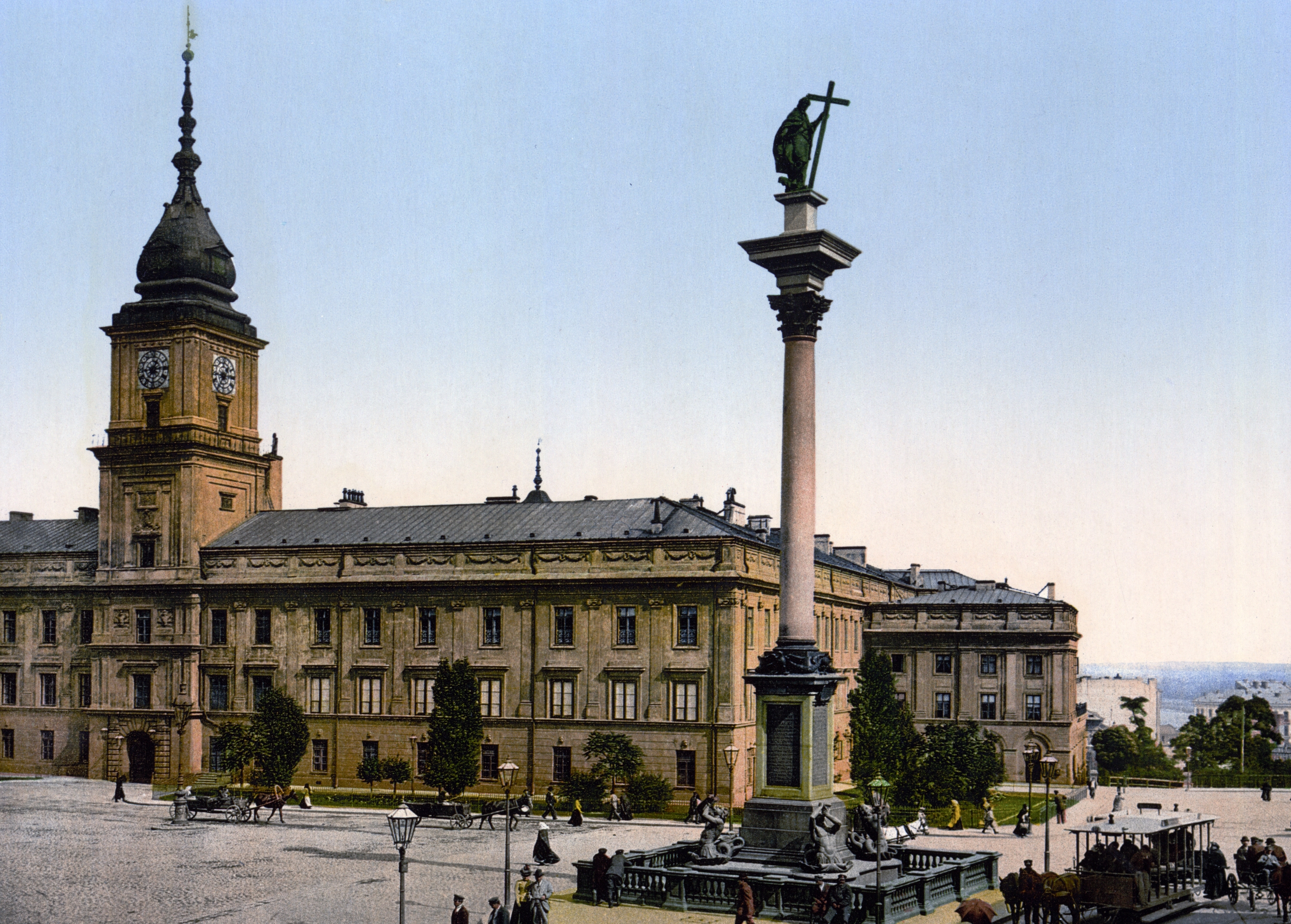

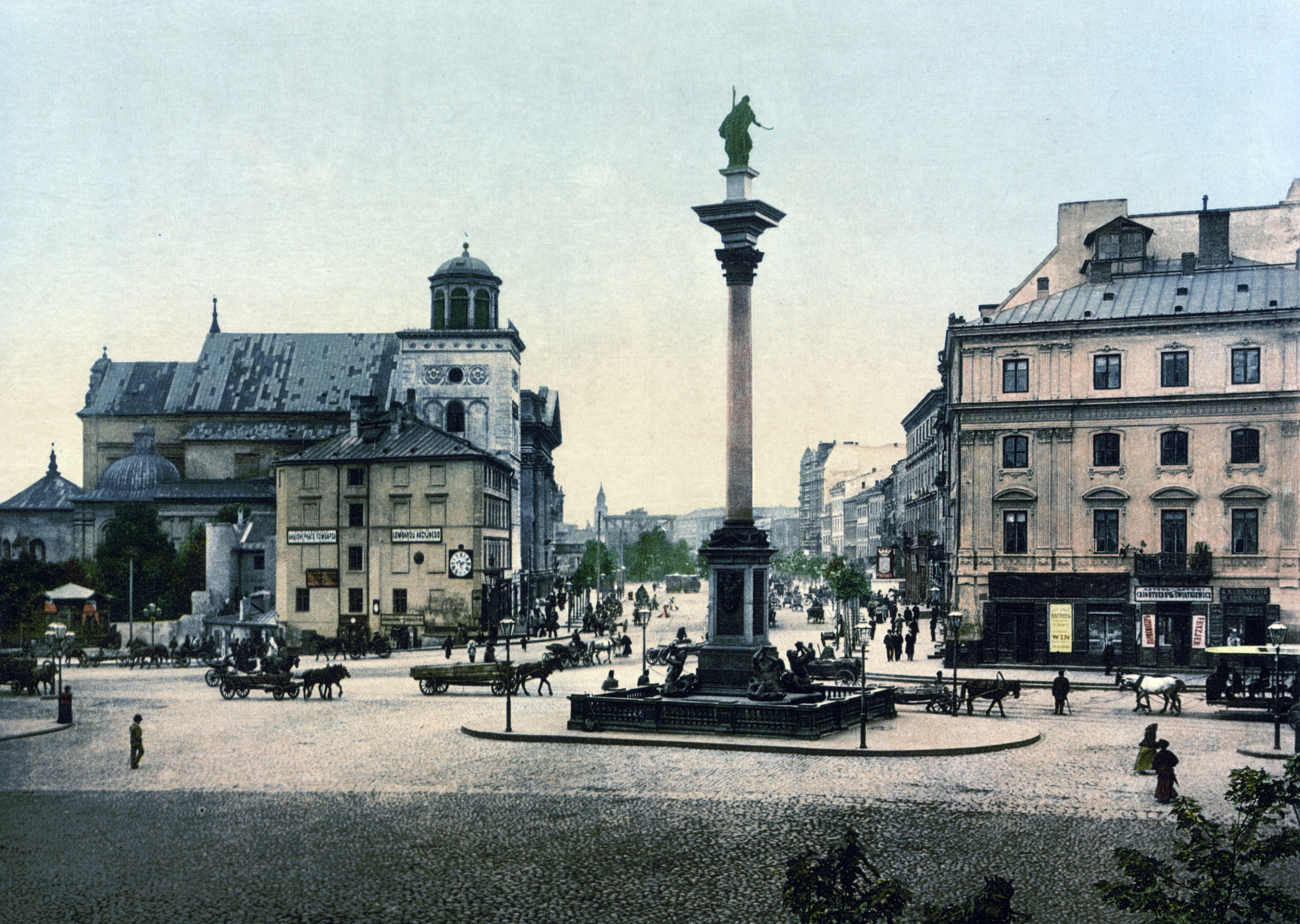

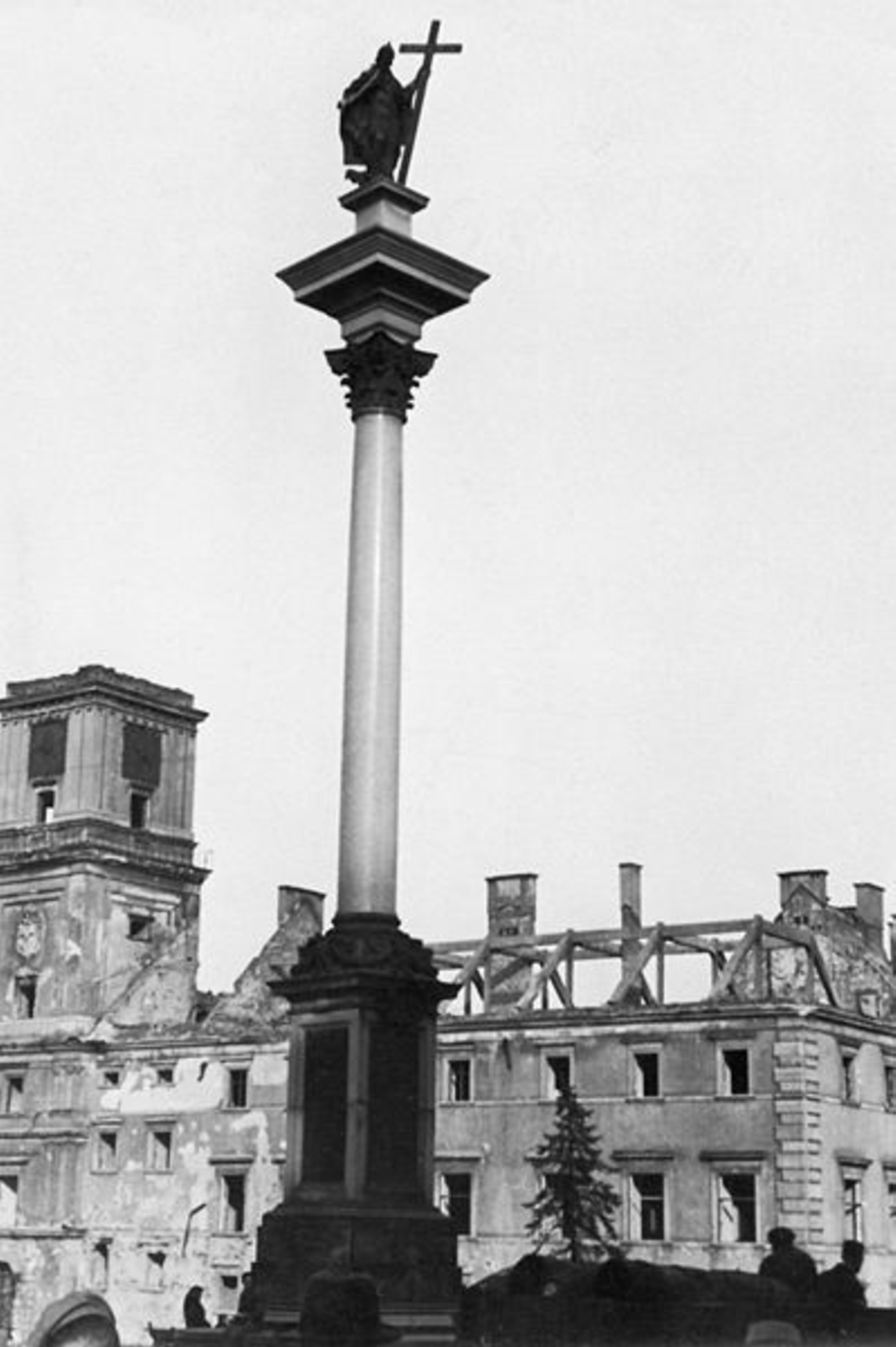

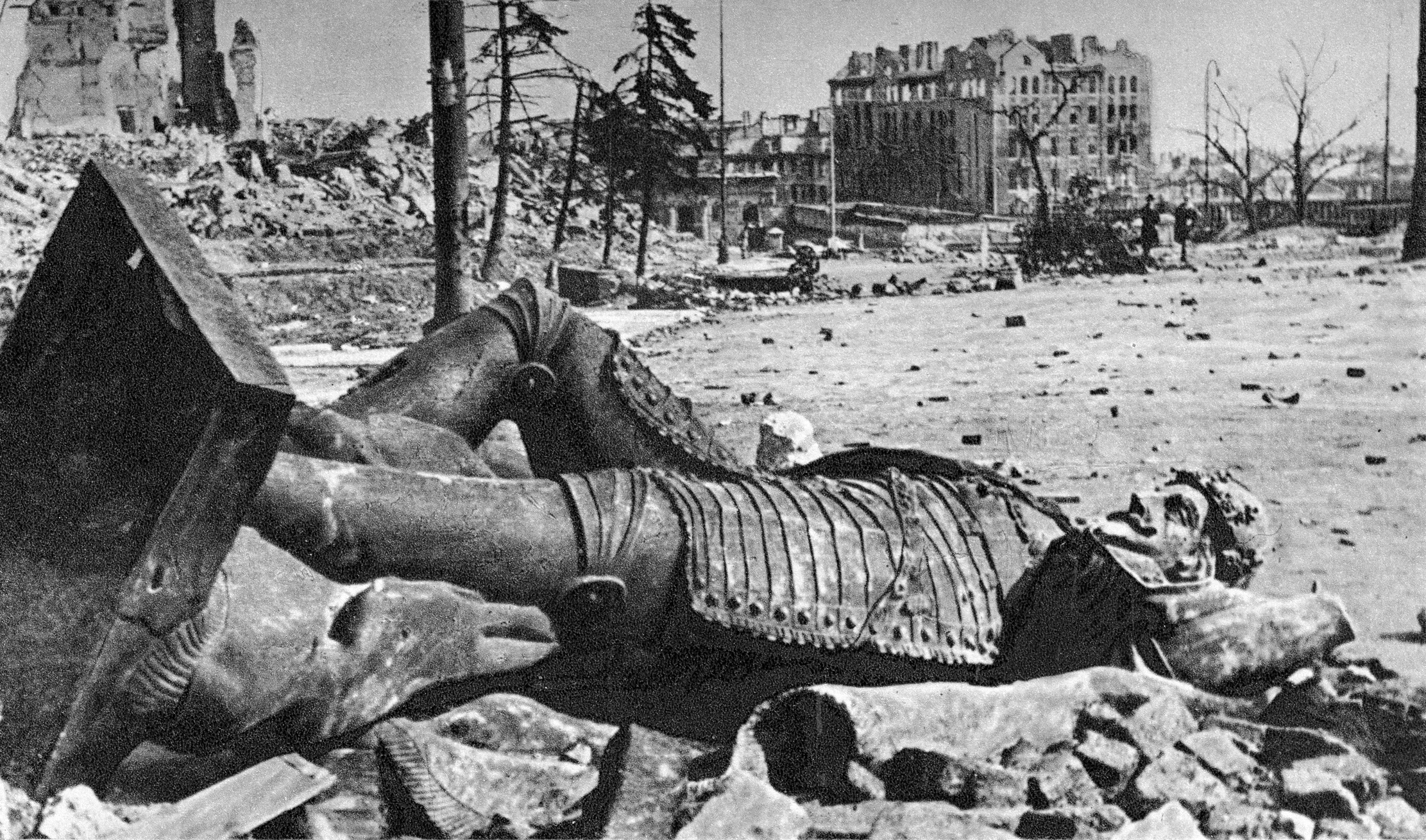

== See also ==
- Warsaw Old Town
- Royal Castle, Warsaw
