= East–West Route, Warsaw =

Road in Warsaw, Poland

East–West Route

Route information
- Length: 6.7 km (4.2 mi)

Location
- Country: Poland
- Districts: Śródmieście; Praga-North

Highway system
- National roads in Poland; Voivodeship roads

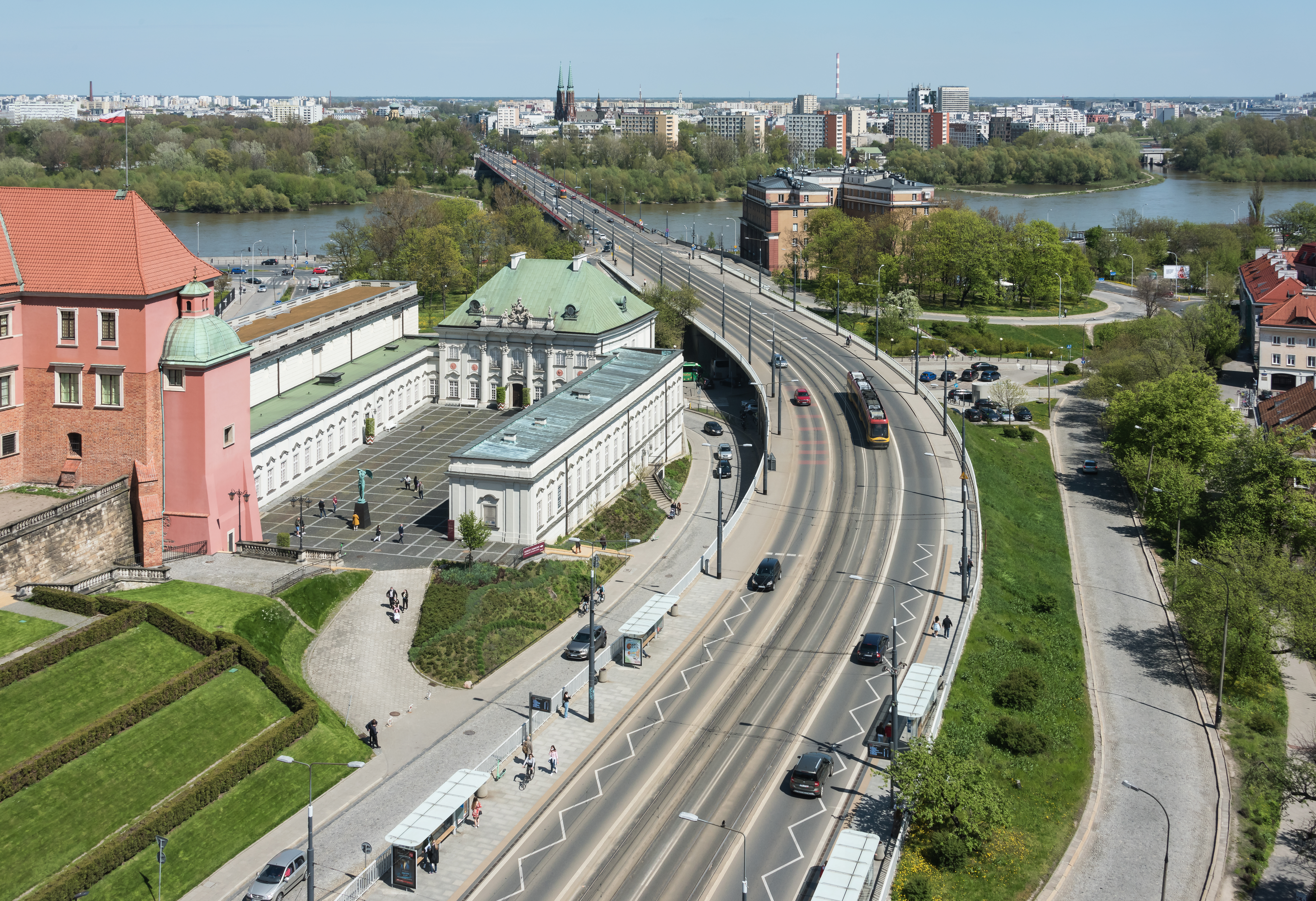
Looking east towards Praga from the St. Anne's Church onto the Śląsko-Dąbrowski Bridge of the route

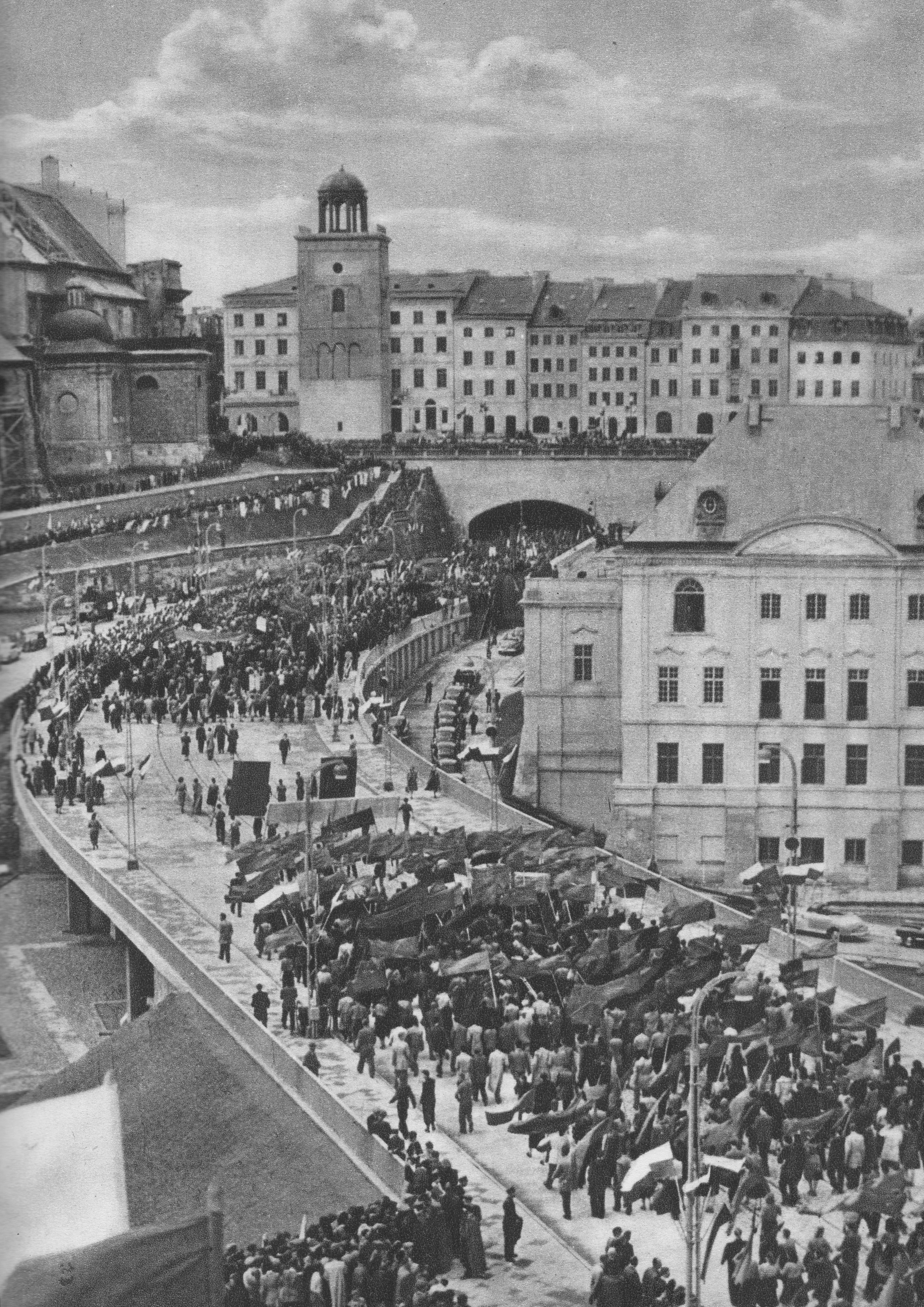
The inauguration of the Route, July 22, 1949

The East–West Route (Polish: Trasa Wschód–Zachód, Trasa W-Z) is a major thoroughfare in Warsaw, Poland, that joins Praga in the east with the city center, going through Muranów and out to Wola in the west.

It was one of the first major post-World War II infrastructure projects, carried out during 1947–1949.
