= Władysław Konstanty Vasa =

Illegitimate son of Władysław IV Vasa (1635–1639)

- Count of Wasenau
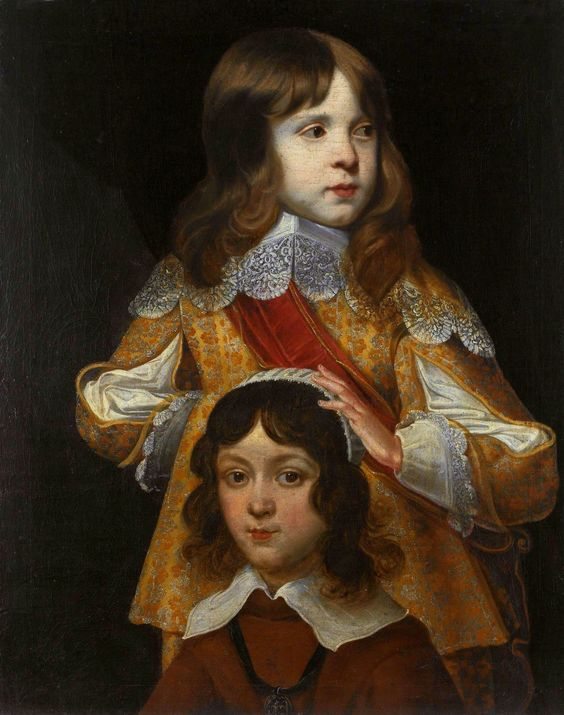
- Prince Sigismund Casimir (upper) and his brother, Władysław Konstanty (lower), 1647
- Born: c. 1635; Warsaw, Poland
- Died: 19 March 1698 (aged 62–63)
- Buried: Santissime Stimmate di San Francesco, Rome
- Family: Vasa
- Father: Władysław IV Vasa
- Mother: Jadwiga Łuszkowska

Władysław Konstanty Vasa, Count of Wasenau (c. 1635 – 19 March 1698), was a member of the House of Vasa as the illegitimate son of the King of Poland and Grand Duke of Lithuania, Władysław IV Vasa, and his mistress, Jadwiga Łuszkowska.

== Life ==
Władysław Konstanty was born in 1635, he was the illegitimate son of King Władysław IV Vasa by his mistress, Jadwiga Łuszkowska. (Note: In an effort to separate King Władysław from his mistress, his wife Cecilia Renata arranged Jadwiga Łuszkowska to marry Jan Wypyski.) Following the death of his father, it is likely Władysław was appointed to the care of his childless paternal uncle, John II Casimir Vasa. Afterward, Władysław could travel freely across Europe.

=== Life in Europe ===
Władysław first left Poland to reside in the Kingdom of France, where he lived life as a libertine and led a dissolute life under the name Count of Wasenau. According to the will of his uncle, the count inherited 30,000 livres, secured by claims to the Spanish King, Charles II.

During his visit spent in the capital of Italy, Rome, Władysław was assigned the position Captain of the Guard for his distant cousin, the former Queen Christina of Sweden. There he was nominated Papal Chamberlain by Pope Alexander VIII, an arrangement confirmed by his successor, Pope Innocent XII. After the death of Christina in 1689, Władysław did not receive the benefits she had intended to leave for him and was reduced to abide living in poverty.

==== Death ====
On 19 March 1698, Władysław died, he was the last representative of the Polish Vasa Lineage and last known descendant of line Sigismund I the Old by his second wife, Bona Sforza. His gravestone was erected by Cardinal Giovanni Francesco Albani (later known as Pope Clement XI), the gravestone was placed for him in the walls near the entrance of the sacristy of the Holy Stigmata of St Francis of Assisi (Italian: Santissime Stimmate di San Francesco.)

== Ancestry ==
Ancestors of Władysław Konstanty Vasa

8. John III of Sweden
4. Sigismund III Vasa
9. Catherine Jagiellon
2. Władysław IV Vasa
10. Charles II, Archduke of Austria
5. Anne of Austria
11. Maria Anna of Bavaria
1. Władysław Konstanty Vasa
6. Jan Łuszkowski
3. Jadwiga Łuszkowska
7. Anna Łuszkowska

== Bibliography ==
- Lindqwist, Herman (2018). Wazowie. Historia burzliwa i brutalna [The Vasas. A turbulent and brutal history] (in Polish). Marginesy. ISBN 978-8365973108.
- Kost, Beata (2017). Kobiety ze Lwowa [Women from Lviv] (in Polish). Marginesy. ISBN 978-8365780676.
- Wdowiszewski, Zygmunt (2005). Genealogia Jagiellonów i Domu Wazów w Polsce [Genealogy of the Jagiellonians and the House of Vasa in Poland] (in Polish). Avalon. ISBN 8391849724.
