= Rozyna Małgorzata von Eckenberg =

- Born: 1625
- Died: 1648 (aged 22–23)
- Occupation: Court official

Rozyna Małgorzata von Eckenberg (1625–1648), was a Polish court official.

She was the daughter of NN von Eckenberg and Margarethe von Toll. She came to Poland as a lady-in-waiting to the new queen of Poland, Cecilia Renata of Austria, and was appointed governess to Sigismund Casimir. Between the death of Cecilia and the next marriage of the king, she was mistress of Władysław IV Vasa from 1644 to 1646. She married Michał Jerzy Czartoryski.
