= Anna Maria Vasa =

Polish princess (1593–1600)

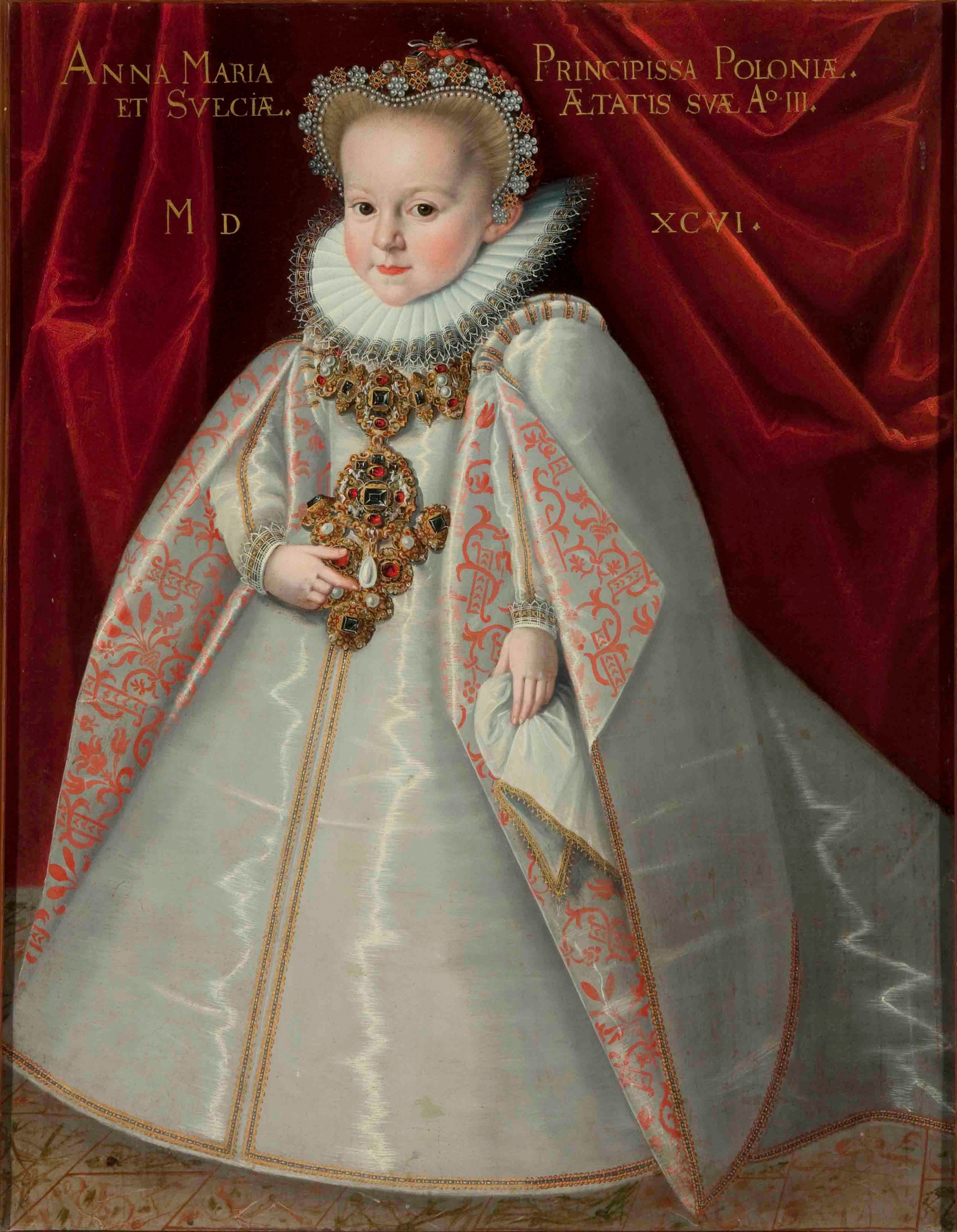
- Portrait by Martin Kober (1596)
- Born: 23 May 1593; Kraków, Poland
- Died: 9 February 1600 (aged 6); Kraków, Poland
- Burial: Wawel Cathedral
- House: Vasa
- Father: Sigismund III Vasa
- Mother: Anne of Austria

Anna Maria Vasa (23 May 1593 – 9 February 1600) was a Polish princess, the eldest daughter of King Sigismund III Vasa and his first wife, Queen Anne of Austria. She was the heiress presumptive to the Swedish throne from 1593 until 1595. (Note: The Polish–Lithuanian Commonwealth functioned as an elective monarchy, which meant it did not have a fixed line of succession but instead elected its monarchs. Notably, her great-aunt, Queen Anna Jagiellon, ruled the realm with her husband, as ancient laws permitted a married woman to assume a governing role.)

== Life ==
=== Birth and background ===
Anna Maria was born on 23 May 1593 in Kraków, Poland. Her parents' marriage was a politically motivated union, aimed to maintain peace between the newly established House of Vasa and the imposing Habsburgs.

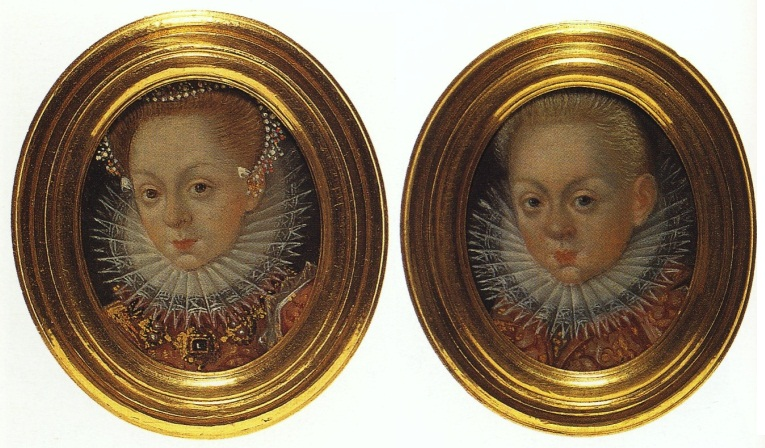
Miniature portraits of Anna Maria and her brother, Władysław, by Martin Kober (1598)

She and her only surviving sibling, Władysław, were raised by Urszula Meyerin (1570–1635), whose influence had significantly skyrocketed since her introduction as a lady of the court of Queen Anne.

On 4 July 1593, the infant princess was taken to her baptism (performed by Cardinal Radziwiłł) by her paternal aunt, the elder Anna Vasa of Sweden. Her great-aunt, the former Queen Anna Jagiellon, whose supervision she was left in when her father embarked on a visit to Sweden, also participated in the event.

Her mother died on 10 February 1598, less than three years after giving birth to her brother. On the day before the second anniversary of the death of her mother, Anna Maria died from a bout of measles at the age of six in Kraków. She was buried in the Wawel Cathedral, with her coffin positioned in front of that of the ill-fated Queen Barbara Zápolya, the first wife of great-grandfather, King Sigismund I the Old.

== Ancestry ==
Ancestors of Anna Maria Vasa

8. Gustav Vasa
4. John III of Sweden
9. Margaret Leijonhufvud
2. Sigismund III Vasa
10. Sigismund I the Old
5. Catherine Jagiellon
11. Bona Sforza
1. Anna Maria Vasa
12. Ferdinand I, Holy Roman Emperor
6. Charles II, Archduke of Austria
13. Anne of Bohemia and Hungary
3. Anne of Austria
14. Albert V, Duke of Bavaria
7. Maria Anna of Bavaria
15. Anna of Austria
