= Hanko Fortress =

Coordinates: 59°48′03″N 22°56′37″E

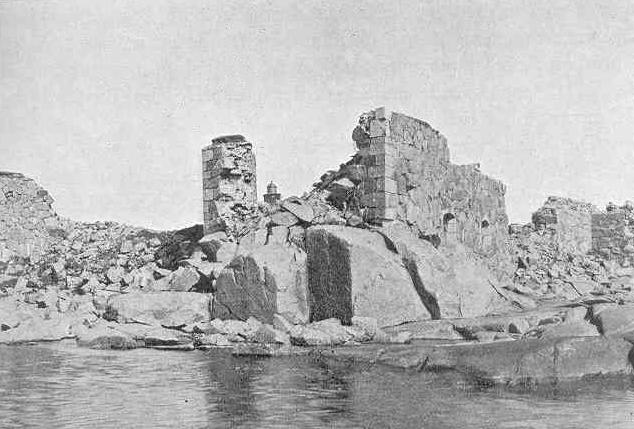
The ruins of the Gustavsvärn fortress photographed around 1900.

Hanko Fortress (Hangöbefästningarna in Swedish) was a fortress built in Hanko at the end of the 18th century, which consisted of the Gustavsvärn, Meijerfeldt and Gustaf Adolf fortresses built on rock outcrops, and the Kuningattarenvuori fortresses located on the mainland. The island fortresses formed a triangle that protected the sea channel leading to the port of Hanko.

== History ==
The first cannon field fortress, Brunerskärin Skanssi, was built on Tulliniemi in Hanko already at the end of the 17th century. The construction of the Hanko fortress actually began after the war of King Gustav III in 1788–1790, when it was decided to replace the temporary field fortifications built on Tulliniemi and its nearby islands with permanent fortifications protecting Hanko harbor. The fortifications were designed by the commander of the fortress brigade, von Kierting, with the help of captain Carl Nycander, and the fortifications were started in the spring of 1793. The fortifications continued until the beginning of the 19th century, but the fortress remained unfinished.

== Finnish war ==
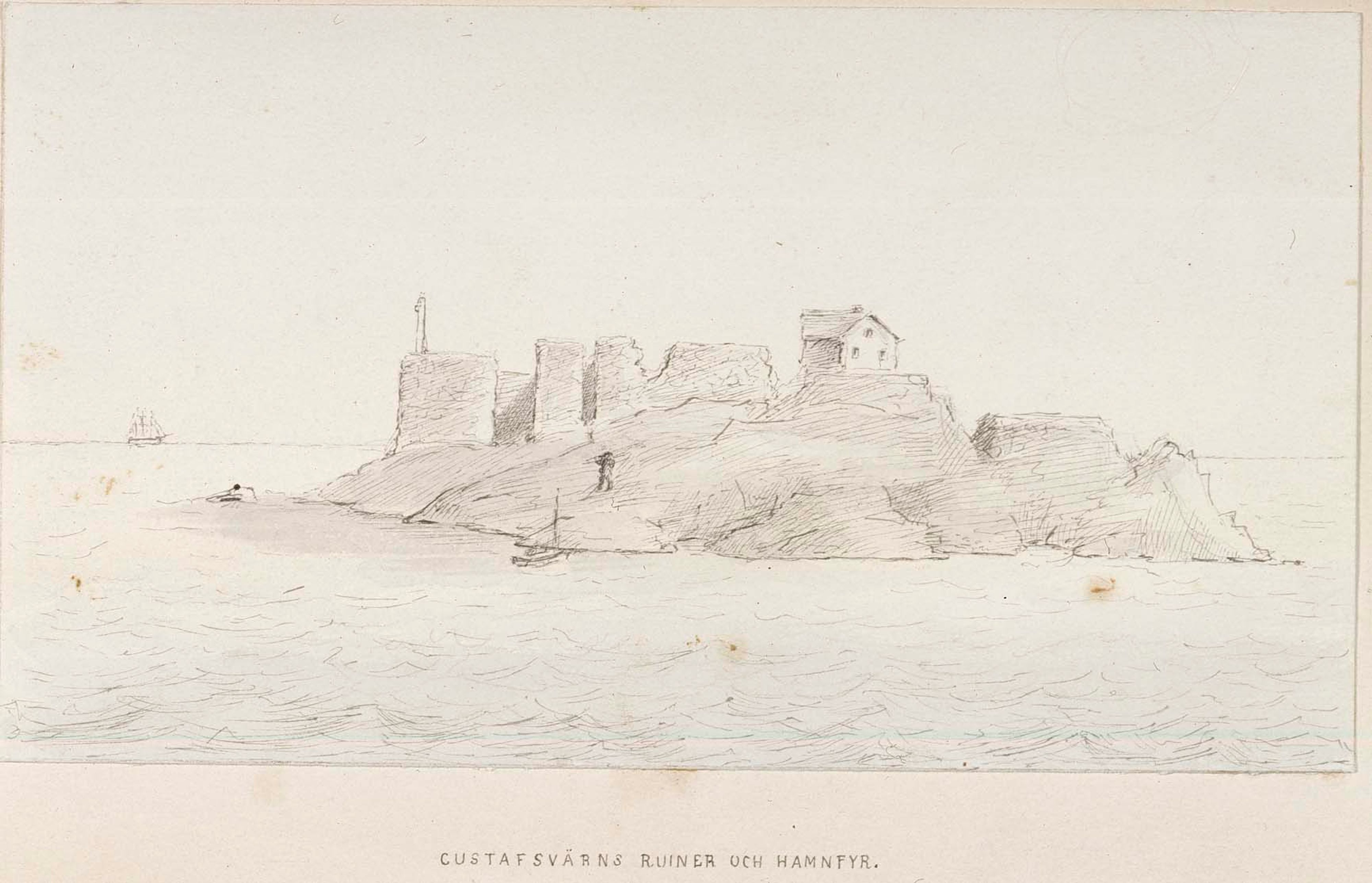
The ruins of Gustavsvärn painted by Albert Edelfelt

During the Finnish war, the Hanko fortress fell to the Russians without a fight. In the 19th century, the Russians continued the fortification work. At the beginning of the Crimean War, the Gustavsvärn fort had 61 cannons and during the war the fort repelled the attack of the British fleet. However, the Hanko fortress was considered too expensive to maintain, so the fortresses located on Gustavsvärn, Kustaa Aadolf and Meijerfeldt islets were blown up in the late summer of 1854.

The furniture of the Hanko fortress is still on the islands of Gustavsvärn and Gustaf Adolf.
