= Jadwiga Łuszkowska =

Polish noblewoman

Jadwiga Wypyska
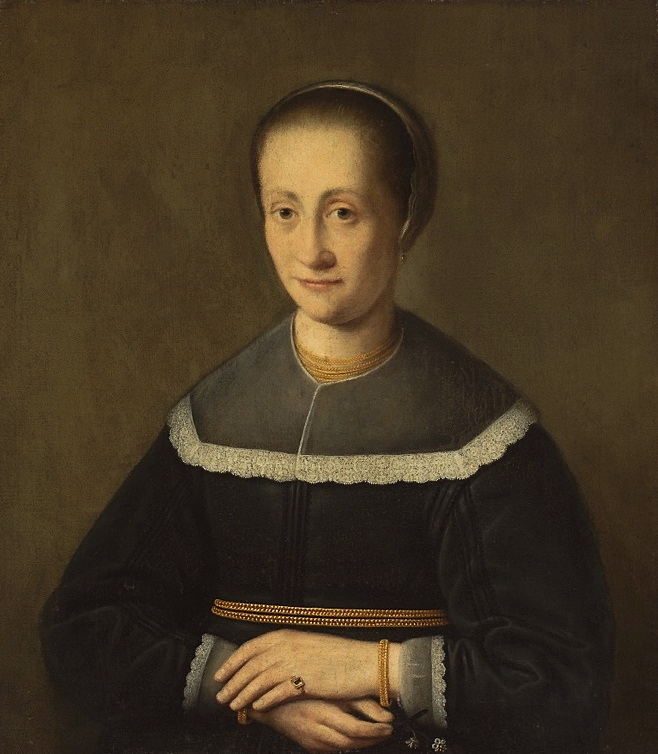
- Portrait of a lady with forget-me-nots (Jadwiga Wypyska?), ca. 1640, National Museum in Warsaw
- Born: c. 1616; Lwów, Polish–Lithuanian Commonwealth
- Died: after 20 May 1648; Merkinė, Polish–Lithuanian Commonwealth
- Spouse(s): Jan Wypyski
- Issue: Władysław Konstanty Vasa
- Father: Jan Łuszkowski
- Mother: Anna

Jadwiga Wypyska (née Łuszkowska; about 1616 in Lviv – after 20 May 1648 in Merkinė) was a Polish noblewoman, known as the mistress of Polish king Ladislaus IV Vasa.

She was the daughter of merchant Jan Łuszkowski (died 1627) and Anna (died after 1635).

She had a son, Władysław Konstanty Vasa, in 1635, and an unknown daughter, the next year.

In 1637, she married Jan Wypyski, starost of Merkinė (died before 18 December 1647).

== Sources ==
- B. Lubosz Opowieści o sławnych kochankach
