= Cornelis Danckerts de Ry =

Dutch Golden Age architect and sculptor

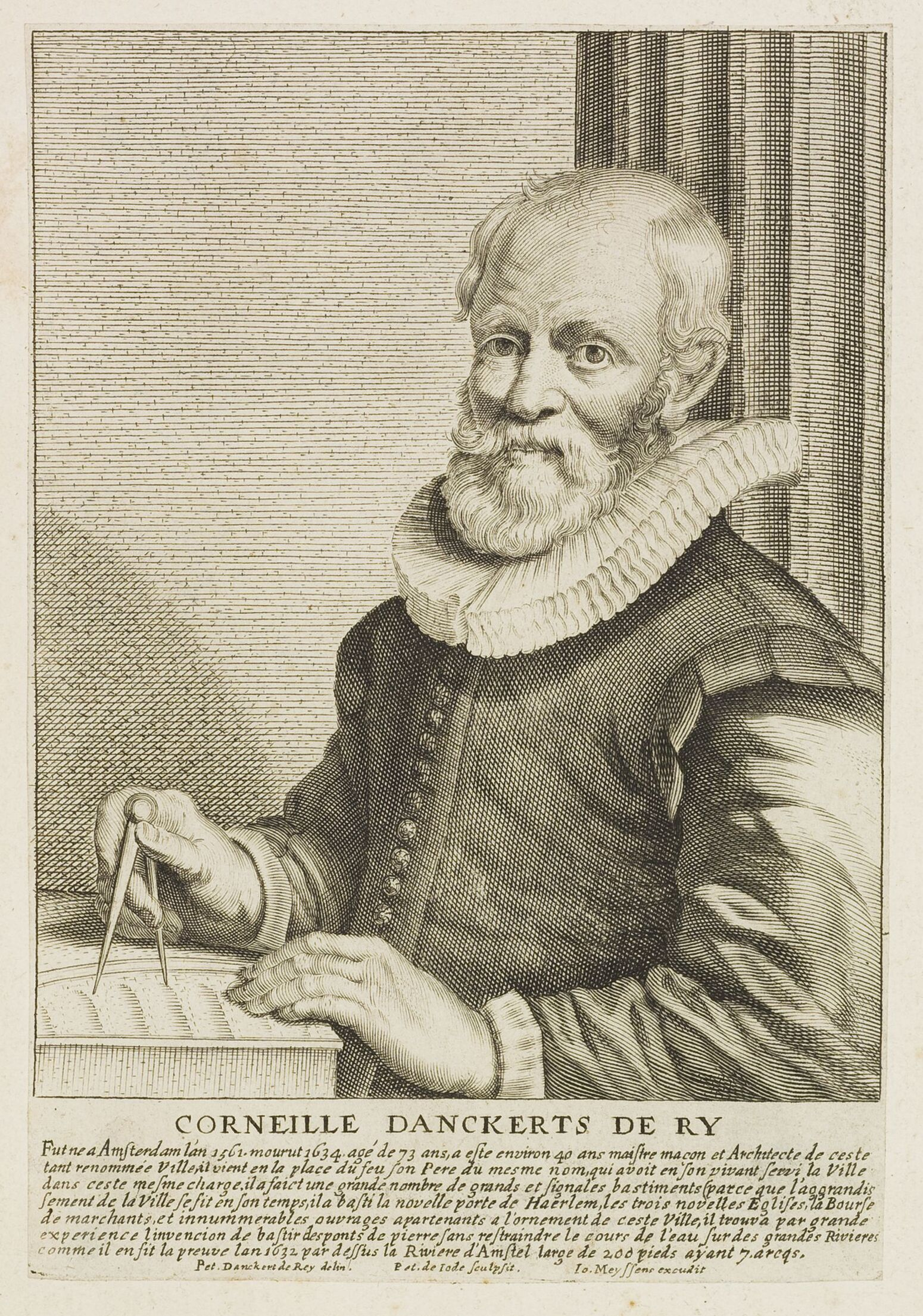
Portrait of Cornelis Danckerts de Ry in Het Gulden Cabinet, by Pieter de Jode II after a portrait by his son Pieter.

Cornelis Danckerts de Ry (1561–1634) was a Dutch Golden Age architect and sculptor.

== Biography ==
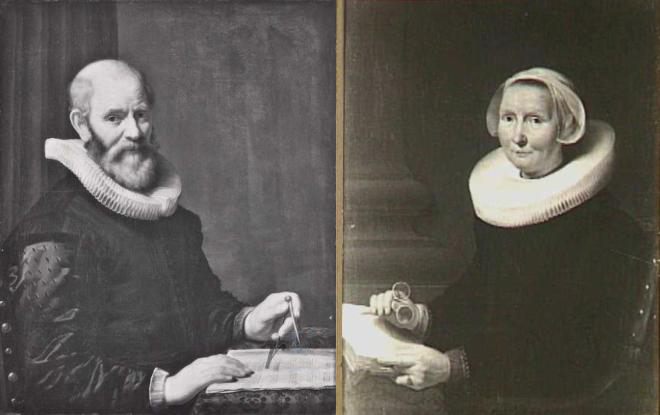
Peter's portraits of his parents.

Danckerts was born and died in Amsterdam. According to the RKD he was the son of the architect Cornelis Danckerts (1536–1595), brother of the builder Hendrick Danckerts I, and father of the painter Pieter Danckerts de Rij, who painted a portrait of both his parents.

In 1634 his son Pieter painted pendant portraits of himself and his wife on the occasion of their 50th anniversary. His wife's portrait hangs in Johannesburg Art Gallery, and Cornelis's portrait hangs in Royal Museums of Fine Arts of Belgium.

According to Cornelis de Bie in his book Het Gulden Cabinet, he built houses and churches in Haarlem. The engraver Pieter de Jode II made an engraving for that book based on Pieter's painting of him.
