= Sigismund Casimir Vasa =

Polish prince and the only legitimate son of King Wladislaus IV

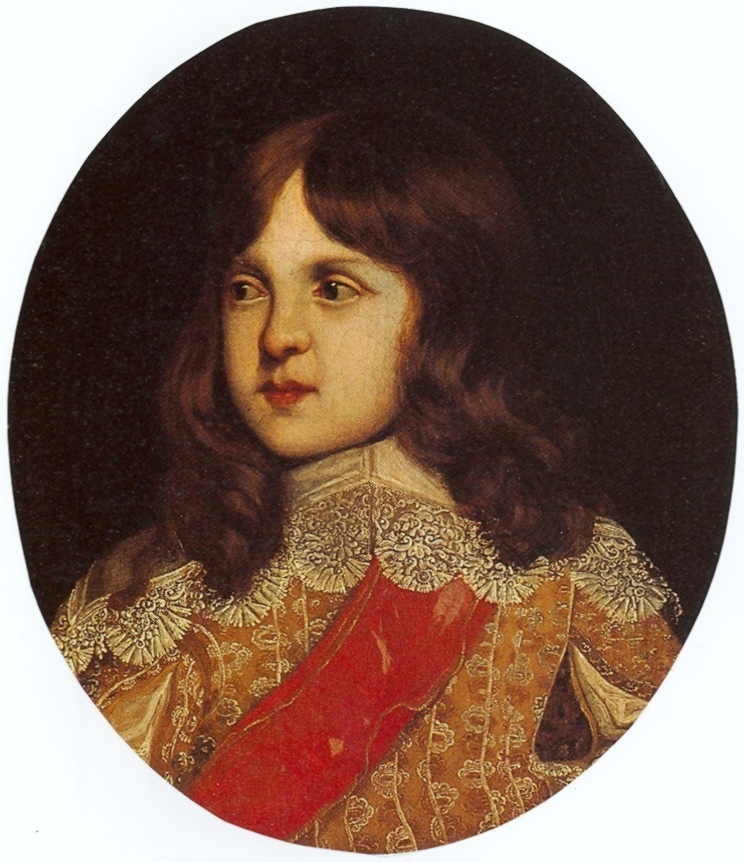
- Born: 1 April 1640; Kraków, Polish–Lithuanian Commonwealth
- Died: 9 August 1647 (aged 7); Nevers, Kingdom of France
- Burial: Wawel Cathedral
- House: Vasa
- Father: Władysław IV of Poland
- Mother: Cecilia Renata of Austria

Sigismund Casimir Vasa (Polish: Zygmunt Kazimierz Waza; 1 April 1640 – 9 August 1647), was a Polish prince and the only legitimate son of King Wladislaus IV and his first wife Queen Cecilia Renata. He was named after his grandfather Sigismund III, and uncle John Casimir.

== Biography ==
He was raised by the governess Rozyna Małgorzata von Eckenberg. As he was an only child, he was the almost certain candidate as the successor of Ladislaus IV. The French traveller, Le Laboureur described him as a child: extremely vivid, lean and agile. He was also seen as being quick-minded, he was a fast learner, and by the age of seven, he was fluent in not only Polish but German too, and made good progress in Latin. The prince willingly dressed in the Polish fashion, which still further strengthened his position as candidate and endeared him to the Poles themselves. In fact, when someone scolded him in German, he replied in Polish "...I am a Pole, so talk to me in Polish".

In the summer of 1647, the boy suddenly fell ill. According to some, it came from overeating certain fruits, while others claimed that he contracted dysentery from the Pomeranian voivode, Gerhard Dönhoff (1590–1648). After five days of pain and bloody diarrhoea, the young prince died. With the death of his only legitimate son, Ladislaus IV's grief was so great, he did not even attend the funeral, held in Krakow, where the young prince was buried at Wawel Cathedral.

== Ancestry ==
Ancestors of Sigismund Casimir Vasa

8. John III of Sweden
4. Sigismund III of Poland
9. Catherine of Poland
2. Władysław IV Vasa
10. Charles II, Archduke of Austria (=12)
5. Anne of Austria, Queen of Poland
11. Maria Anna of Bavaria (=13)
1. Sigismund Casimir Vasa
12. Charles II, Archduke of Austria (=10)
6. Ferdinand II, Holy Roman Emperor
13. Maria Anna of Bavaria (=11)
3. Cecilia Renata of Austria
14. William V, Duke of Bavaria
7. Maria Anna of Bavaria
15. Renata of Lorraine
