= Peter Danckerts de Rij =

Dutch painter (1605–1660)

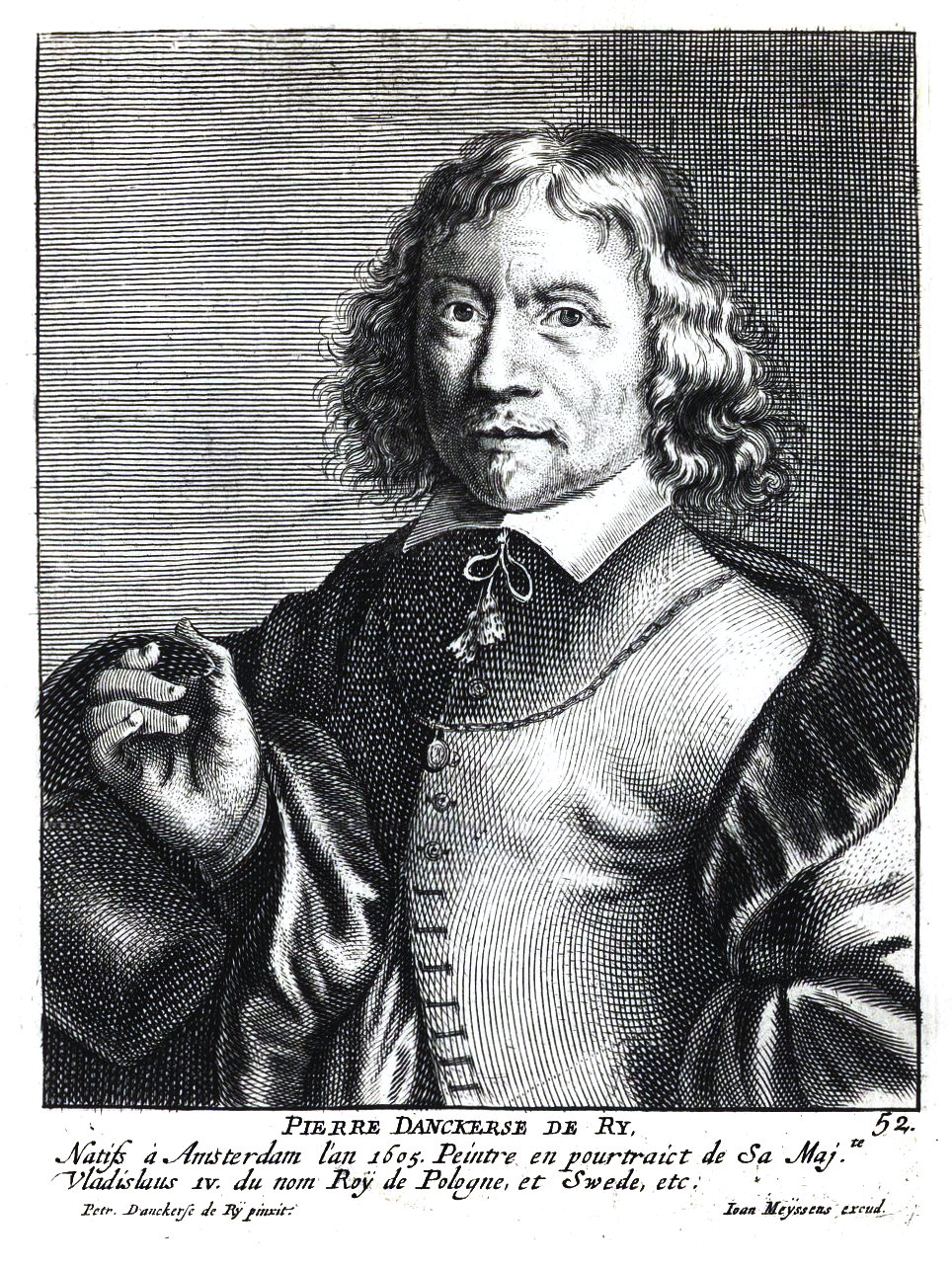
Portrait of Pieter Danckerts de Ry in Cornelis de Bie's Het Gulden Cabinet.

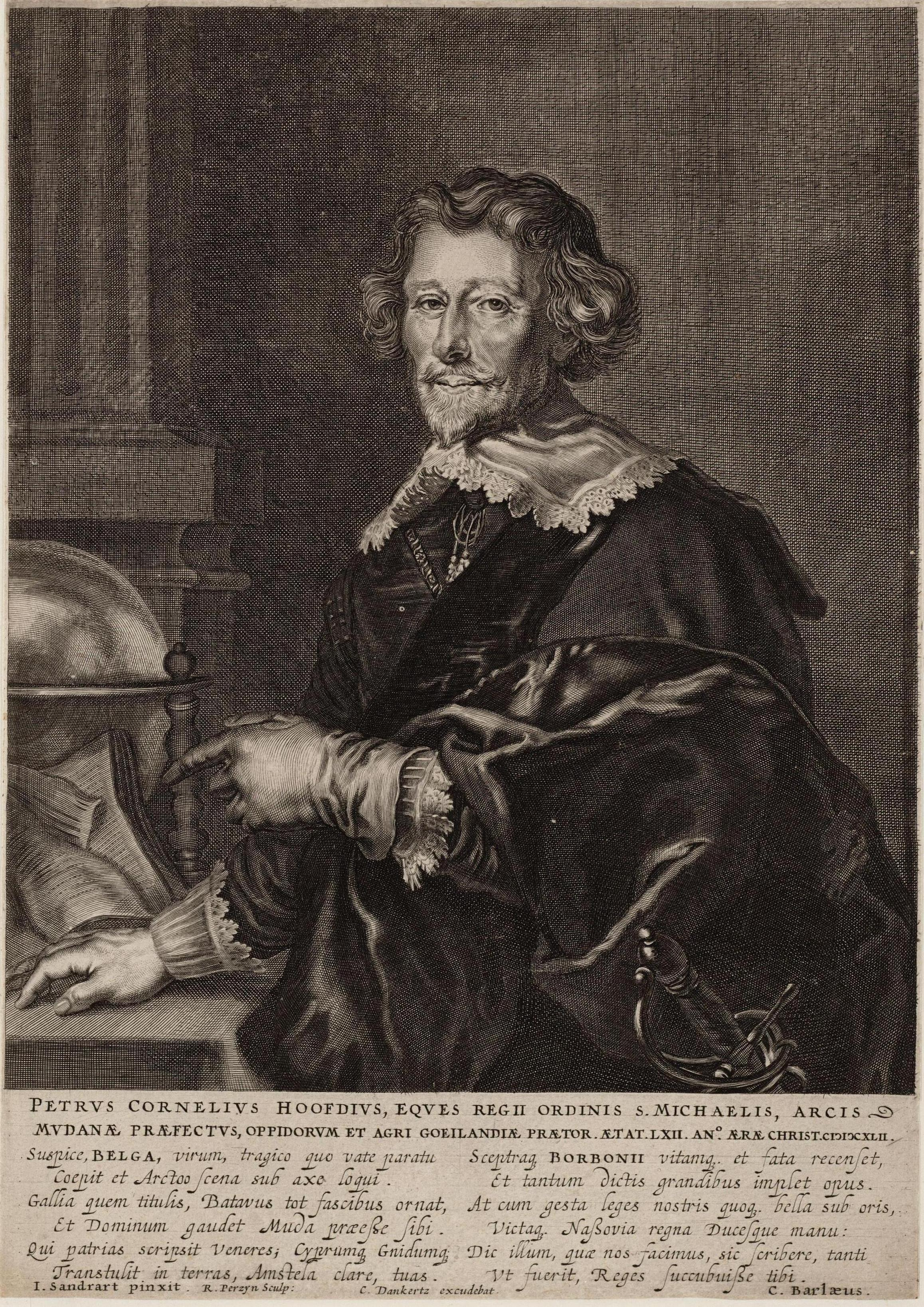
Example of Dankerts-Sandrart collaboration in print of PC Hooft. This 1642 engraving was painted by Sandrart, etched by Reinier van Persijn, and printed by Danckerts. The poem in Latin at the bottom was written by Caspar Barlaeus.

Pieter, Peeter, or Peter Danckerts de Rij, Dankers de Ry, or Peteris Dankersas (1605, in Amsterdam – buried 15 December 1660, Amsterdam). was a Dutch Golden Age painter mostly active in the Polish–Lithuanian Commonwealth and Sweden.

== Life and career ==
He was the son of Cornelis Danckerts de Ry, member of a large family of printers, painters and engravers.

Cornelis is mentioned in Houbraken's Schouburg as being one of the many teachers of Joachim von Sandrart in 1640-41, though considering Sandrart's age and experience (he had just returned to the North from his Grand Tour to Italy), this was more of a collaboration. Since Filippo Baldinucci later wrote a biographical sketch on Pietro Danckerse de Ry in his list of artists called the Notizie, it is possible that Danckerts visited Italy at some time. In any case Sandrart engraved some of Peter's paintings after this period. Between 1634 and 1638 he moved to Warsaw, and later Danzig, and Vilnius in the Polish–Lithuanian Commonwealth. Here he was the court painter and architect of King Władysław IV Vasa. According to Houbraken a poem was written in his honor that applauds his work in Poland.

In 1648 he moved to be a painter at the court of Queen Christina in Stockholm. Her successor, King Charles X Gustav, held him in high regard. He returned to the Dutch Republic in 1659 and died in Amsterdam in December of the next year.

The story that he died in August 1661 as the result of a highway robbery in the Rūdninkai Forest near Vilnius involves an unnamed artist aged 78, while Danckerts would have been 55. This incident possibly concerns one of Danckerts' successors at the Polish court instead.

== Parents portraits ==
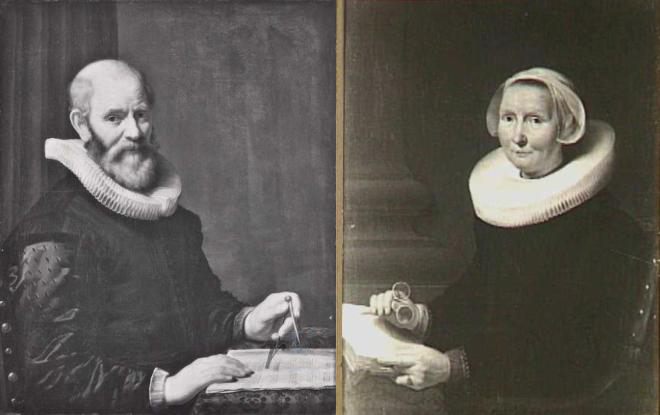
Peter's portraits of his parents.

In 1634 Peter painted pendant portraits of his parents, his father Cornelis the painter and his mother. His mother's portrait hangs in Johannesburg Art Gallery, and his father's portrait hangs in Royal Museums of Fine Arts of Belgium.

== Works ==
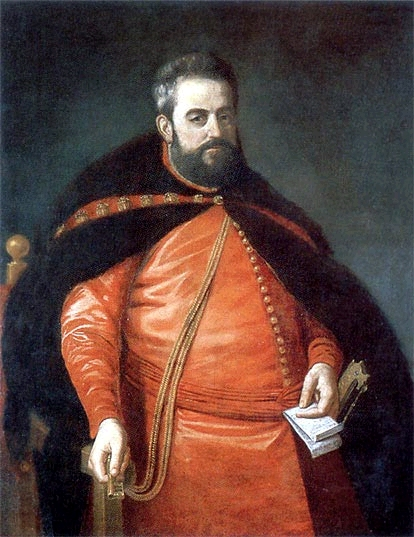
Adam Kazanowski, 1638

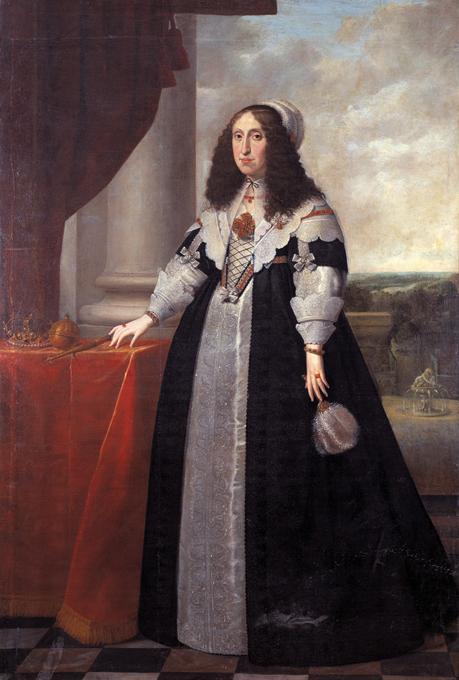
Queen Cecilia Renata of Austria, 1630s

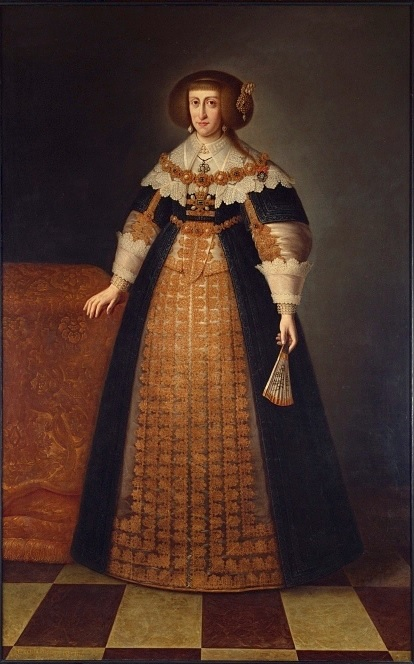
Queen Cecilia Renata of Austria, c. 1640
