= List of Finnish royal consorts =

This list presents the consorts associated with the rulers of Finland across its various historical periods. It includes the spouses of the Dukes of Finland during the Middle Ages and the early modern era (up to 1563), when the title was usually held by members of the Swedish royal family; the spouses of the Grand Dukes of Finland during the Swedish period (from the 1580s to 1809); and the consorts of the Russian emperors, who held the title of Grand Duke of Finland during the period of the Grand Duchy of Finland (1809–1917). The list also includes the spouse of Friedrich Karl of Hesse, the German prince elected King of Finland in 1918, who never assumed the throne.

== Swedish Duchy of Finland (until 1563) ==
Picture	Name	Father	Birth	Marriage	Became Duchess	Ceased to be Duchess	Death	Spouse
	Christina Torgilsdotter	Torkel Knutsson	-	1302, after 2 December		9 December 1305 divorce	-	Valdemar
	Ingeborg Eriksdottir of Norway	Eric II of Norway (Fairhair)	1297	29 September 1312		16 February 1318 husband's death	1353-7	Valdemar
	Ingeborg Ulvsdotter of Tofta	Ulf Abjörnsson (Sparre)	-	-	1353 husband inherit title	1356	-	Bengt Algotsson
	Catherine Jagellon	Sigismund I the Old (Jagellon)	1 November 1526	4 October 1562		1563 husband imprisoned and stripped of title	16 September 1583	John

== Swedish Grand Duchy of Finland (1580s–1809) ==
=== House of Vasa ===
Picture	Name	Father	Birth	Marriage	Became Consort	Ceased to be Consort	Death	Spouse
	Catherine Jagiellon	Sigismund I the Old (Jagiellon)	1 November 1526	4 October 1562	1580s husband adopted title	16 September 1583		John III
	Gunilla Bielke	Johan Axelsson Bielke (Bielke)	25 June 1568	15 February 1585		17 November 1592 husband's death	19 July 1597	John III
	Anna of Austria	Charles II, Archduke of Austria (Habsburg)	16 August 1573	31 May 1592	17 November 1592 husband inherit title	10 February 1598		Sigismund
	Christina of Holstein-Gottorp	Adolf, Duke of Holstein-Gottorp (Holstein-Gottorp)	13 April 1573	8 July 1592	22 March 1604 husband inherit title	30 October 1611 husband's death	8 December 1625	Charles IX
	Maria Eleonora of Brandenburg	John Sigismund, Elector of Brandenburg (Hohenzollern)	11 November 1599	25 November 1620		6 November 1632 husband's death	28 March 1655	Gustav II Adolf

=== House of Palatinate-Zweibrücken ===
Picture	Name	Father	Birth	Marriage	Became Grand Duchess	Ceased to be Grand Duchess	Death	Spouse
	Hedvig Eleonora of Holstein-Gottorp	Frederick III, Duke of Holstein-Gottorp (Holstein-Gottorp)	23 October 1636	24 October 1654		13 February 1660 husband's death	24 November 1715	Charles X Gustav
	Ulrika Eleonora of Denmark	Frederick III of Denmark (Oldenburg)	11 September 1656	6 May 1680		26 July 1693		Charles XI

Title fell into disuse

== Grand Duchy of Finland under Russian Empire (1809–1917) ==
=== House of Holstein-Gottorp-Romanov ===
Picture	Name	Father	Birth	Marriage	Became Grand Duchess	Ceased to be Grand Duchess	Death	Spouse
	Louise of Baden	Charles Louis, Hereditary Prince of Baden (Zähringen)	24 January 1779	28 September 1793	29 March 1809 husband gain title	1 December 1825 husband's death	16 May 1826	Alexander I
	Charlotte of Prussia	Frederick William III of Prussia (Hohenzollern)	13 July 1798	13 July 1817	1 December 1825 husband's ascension	2 March 1855 husband's death	1 November 1860	Nicholas I
	Marie of Hesse and by Rhine	Louis II, Grand Duke of Hesse (Hesse-Darmstadt)	8 August 1824	16 April 1841	2 March 1855 husband's ascension	8 June 1880		Alexander II
	Dagmar of Denmark	Christian IX of Denmark (Schleswig-Holstein-Sonderburg-Glücksburg)	26 November 1847	9 November 1866	13 March 1881 husband's ascession	1 November 1894 husband's death	13 October 1928	Alexander III
	Alix of Hesse and by Rhine	Louis IV, Grand Duke of Hesse (Hesse-Darmstadt)	6 June 1872	26 November 1894	1 November 1894 husband's ascession	15 March 1917; Russian monarchy abolished	17 July 1918	Nicholas II

== Kingdom of Finland (1918) ==
=== House of Hesse-Kassel ===
Picture	Name	Father	Birth	Marriage	Became Queen	Ceased to be Queen	Death	Spouse
	Margaret of Prussia	Frederick III, German Emperor (Hohenzollern)	22 April 1872	25 January 1893	9 October 1918 husband's election	14 December 1918 husband renounced throne	22 January 1954	Friedrich Karl of Hesse

== See also ==
- List of Swedish consorts
- List of Russian consorts
