= Anne of Austria, Queen of Poland =

Queen of Poland and Sweden from 1592 to 1598

Anne of Austria
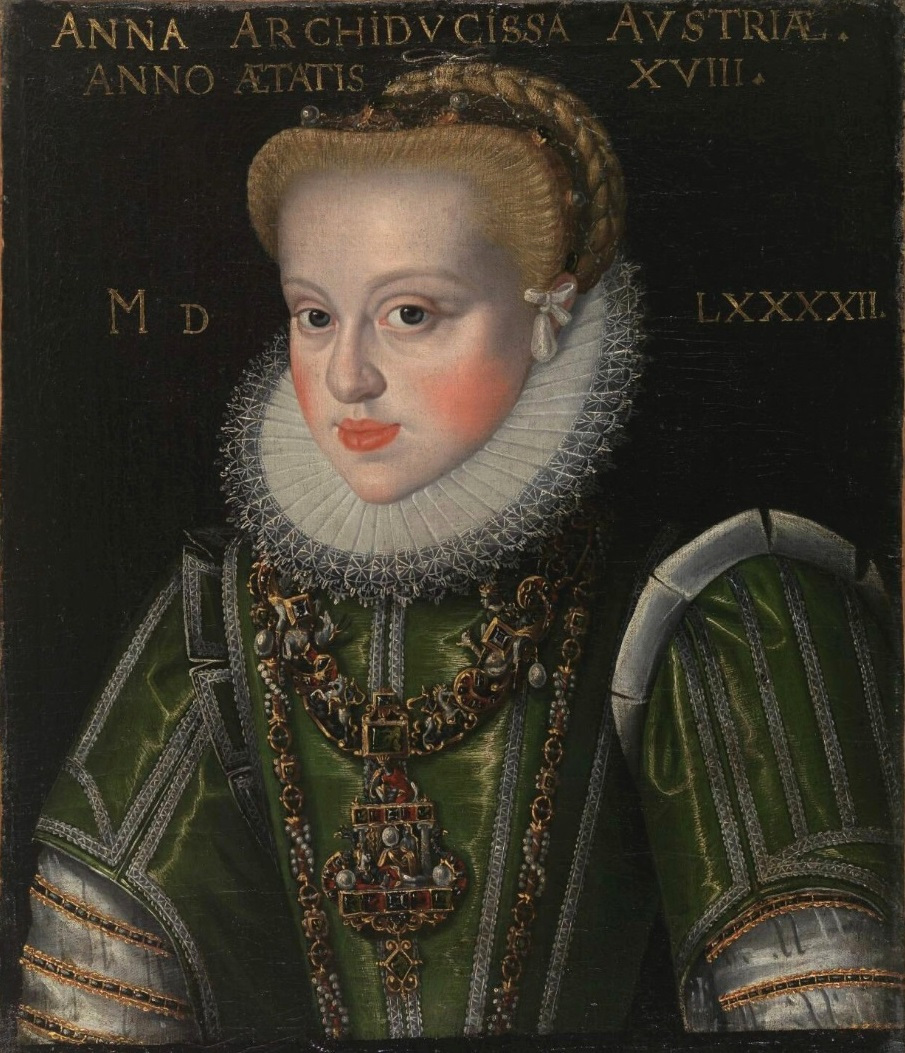
- Portrait c. 1592

Queen consort of Poland Grand Duchess consort of Lithuania
- Tenure: 31 May 1592 – 10 February 1598
- Coronation: 31 May 1592; Wawel Cathedral, Kraków

Queen consort of Sweden Grand Duchess consort of Finland
- Tenure: 17 November 1592 – 10 February 1598
- Coronation: 19 February 1594
- Born: 16 August 1573; Graz, Styria, Holy Roman Empire
- Died: 10 February 1598 (aged 24); Warsaw, Poland, Polish–Lithuanian Commonwealth
- Burial: Wawel Cathedral, Kraków
- Spouse: Sigismund III Vasa (m. 1592)
- Issue Detail: Władysław IV Vasa; Anna Maria Vasa
- House: Habsburg
- Father: Charles II, Archduke of Austria
- Mother: Maria Anna of Bavaria

Anne of Austria (16 August 1573 – 10 February 1598) was Queen of Poland and Sweden and a Grand Duchess of Lithuania as the first consort of King Sigismund III Vasa.

== Biography ==
Anne was a daughter of Charles II of Austria and Maria Anna of Bavaria. She was the grandchild of Ferdinand I, Holy Roman Emperor and Anna of Bohemia and Hungary (1503–1547).

Her mother was an important supporter of the Counter-Reformation in Inner Austria who gave her children an upbringing focused on Catholicism. The siblings were made to attend church from the age of one, their first words were to be Jesus and Mary, they were tutored by Catholic priests, and Latin was to be a priority before their native German language. As a child, Anna was called "Andle", and she was taught to translate Pedro de Ribadeneira's Vita Ignatii Loyolæ from Latin to German. Outside of Latin and Catholicism, she was mainly tutored in household tasks such as sewing and cooking.

=== Marriage ===
In 1577, the Papal envoy to Sweden, Antonio Possevino, suggested that the children of King John III of Sweden be married to children of the Habsburg dynasty. This was in a period when Sweden was close to a Counter-Reformation under John III and his Polish queen and Lithuanian duchess Catherine Jagiellon. The Pope gave his approval to the idea of a marriage alliance between the Habsburgs and Sweden in the persons of Anna and Sigismund, as did the Polish king and queen, and when visiting Graz in 1578, Possevino acquired a portrait of Anna to bring with him on his next visit to the Swedish court.

Soon after, however, a new proposal was made to arrange a marriage between Anna and Henry of Lorraine to prevent French expansion in Lorraine, and for a while, these plans were given priority. In 1585, Anna accompanied her parents to the Imperial court in Vienna and Prague, unofficially to investigate a possible marriage to her cousin Emperor Rudolf II, but those plans did not come to fruition either.

In 1586-1587, when Prince Sigismund of Sweden was elected king of Poland and Grand Duke of Lithuania, his maternal aunt, Queen Anna Jagiellon, resumed the old plans of a marriage between Sigismund and Anna. Anna's parents, however, still preferred the match with Henry of Lorraine, especially because of the political instability in Poland, the opposition of Chancellor Jan Zamoyski and Archbishop Maximilian's desire for the Polish-Lithuanian crown. In 1589, the Polish court opted for Maria Anna of Bavaria instead. In 1591, however, the Emperor finally decided that a marriage to Sigismund would be the match for Anna which would best benefit the Habsburg dynasty. Count Gustaf Brahe was sent as an envoy to Graz, and other formalities were negotiated by Sigismund's favorite Cardinal Jerzy Radziwiłł, and Anna, who was personally unwilling, was told to obey the Emperor's command.

In April 1592, the betrothal was formally celebrated in the Imperial Court in Vienna; on 4 May, a proxy wedding was celebrated, after which Anna and her mother departed for the wedding in Krakow. Anne became the first wife of Sigismund III on 31 May 1592. This marriage was opposed by many szlachta (nobles) of the Polish–Lithuanian Commonwealth, who were opposed to the alliance with the Austrian Habsburgs that Sigismund pursued.

When Sigismund sent Cardinal Radziwill to Prague for his bride, the anti-Habsburg party with Chancellor Jan Zamoyski guarded the borders to prevent the Archduchess from entering the country. Anne evaded the guards, arrived in Kraków, and was crowned in May 1592 by Primas Karnkowski as the Queen of Poland and Grand Duchess of Lithuania. Later, during her lifetime, the capital of the Commonwealth was moved from Kraków to Warsaw.

=== Queen of Poland and Grand Duchess of Lithuania ===
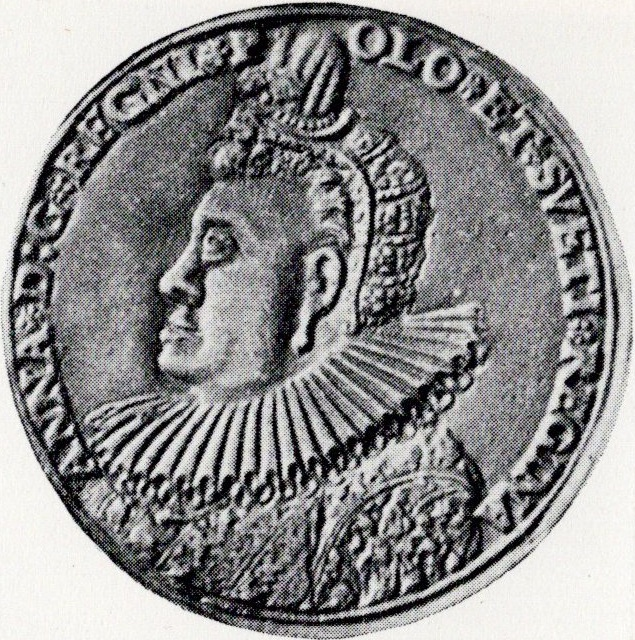
Medal of Queen Anne about 1595

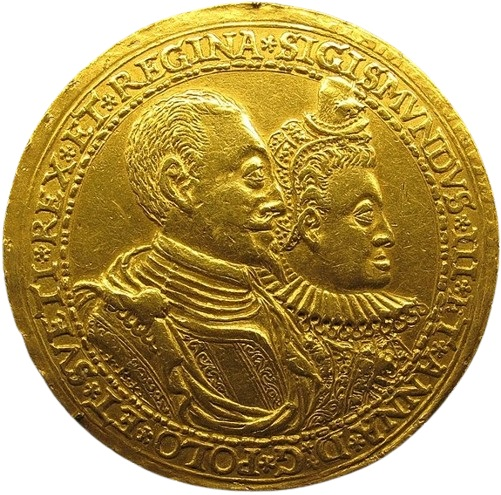
Gold coin of Anne and Sigismund in 1598

Anna was described as attractive and intelligent. She acquired the confidence and love of the introvert Sigismund, and their relationship was described as a happy one, with her functioning as his support during the many trials of the politically unstable 1590s.

Sigismund became king of Sweden as well in 1592, and the king and queen were required to go to Sweden to be crowned. The Poles did not want Sigismund to leave the Commonwealth and demanded that Anna remain in Poland as a hostage. Sigismund rejected this condition, and they departed for Sweden in 1593.

The voyage to Sweden was difficult, and Anne was pregnant. Anne did not like Sweden, nor did she make a good impression on the Swedes: raised as a fervent Catholic, she strongly disapproved of the Protestant Swedes, whom she regarded as heretics, and could not tolerate the Lutheran clergy. She became involved in a conflict with the Protestant Dowager Queen Gunilla Bielke, whom she accused of having stolen valuables from the Royal Palace. She felt a strong mistrust toward her husband's Swedish Protestant uncle, Duke Charles. She was crowned as the Queen of Sweden in Uppsala Cathedral on 19 February 1594, but because the ceremony was a Protestant one, she viewed it as an empty ceremony of no consequence. Her political influence as the confidant of Sigismund was noted, and Anne and her Jesuit confessor Sigismund Ehrenhöffer acted as a channel between the king and the Papal envoy Germanico Malaspina, to whom they gave information about the king's policy.

In April 1594 in Stockholm, she gave birth to a daughter, Catherine, whose baptism was elaborately celebrated at the Swedish court, but the child died soon after.

The Poles had demanded that she leave her daughter Anna Maria behind her as a hostage in Poland during their stay in Sweden. She had also been afraid that the Swedes would demand to keep her daughter Catherine (born in Sweden) when she returned to Poland. On her departure from Sweden in July 1594, she was granted the towns of Linköping, Söderköping, and Stegeborg as personal domains on the condition that she respect the Protestant belief within these fiefs.

Upon their return to the Commonwealth, Anne acted as the confidant of Sigismund. She advised him on navigating between the Polish-Lithuanian noble factions, on the League against the Ottoman Empire, and especially on the relationship between Poland and the Habsburg dynasty. She had however no interest in maintaining the personal union between the Catholic Polish-Lithuanian Commonwealth and Protestant Sweden, and used her influence to oppose the plan to have her son Wladislaus succeed Sweden by sending him there to be brought up a Protestant.

Anne died on 10 February 1598 in Warsaw while pregnant with her last child; her son Christopher was delivered via caesarean section after her death. However, he died the same day. Sigismund III then married her sister Constance Habsburg.

== Issue ==
Anna had five children, but only Władysław lived to become an adult:

1. Anna Maria (23 May 1593 – 9 February 1600)
2. Catherine (19 April 1594 – 16 May 1594)
3. Władysław (9 June 1595 – 20 May 1648), (reigned 1632-1648 as Władysław IV of Poland and Lithuania)
4. Catherine (27 September 1596 – 2 June 1597)
5. Christopher (10 February 1598 – 10 February 1598), born after his mother's death

== Ancestors ==
Ancestors of Anne of Austria, Queen of Poland

8. Philip I of Castile
4. Ferdinand I, Holy Roman Emperor (=14)
9. Joanna of Castile
2. Charles II of Austria
10. Vladislas II of Bohemia and Hungary
5. Anna of Bohemia and Hungary (=15)
11. Anna of Foix-Candale
1. Archduchess Anne of Austria
12. William IV, Duke of Bavaria
6. Albert V, Duke of Bavaria
13. Marie of Baden-Sponheim
3. Maria Anna of Bavaria
14. Ferdinand I, Holy Roman Emperor (= 4)
7. Anna of Austria
15. Anna of Bohemia and Hungary (= 5)

== Gallery ==
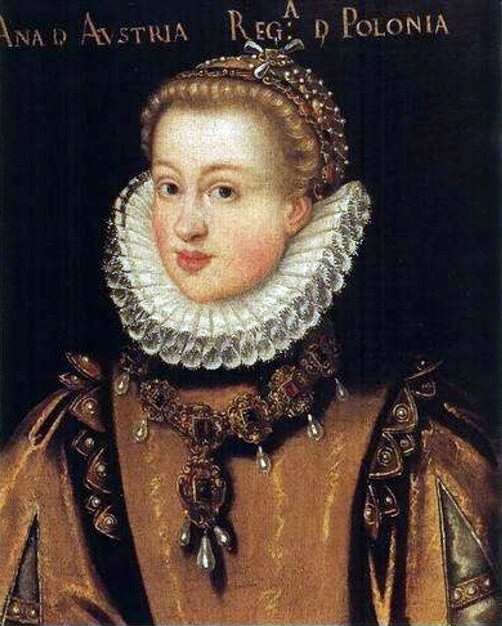
Early portrait of Anne attributed to Jan Szwankowski

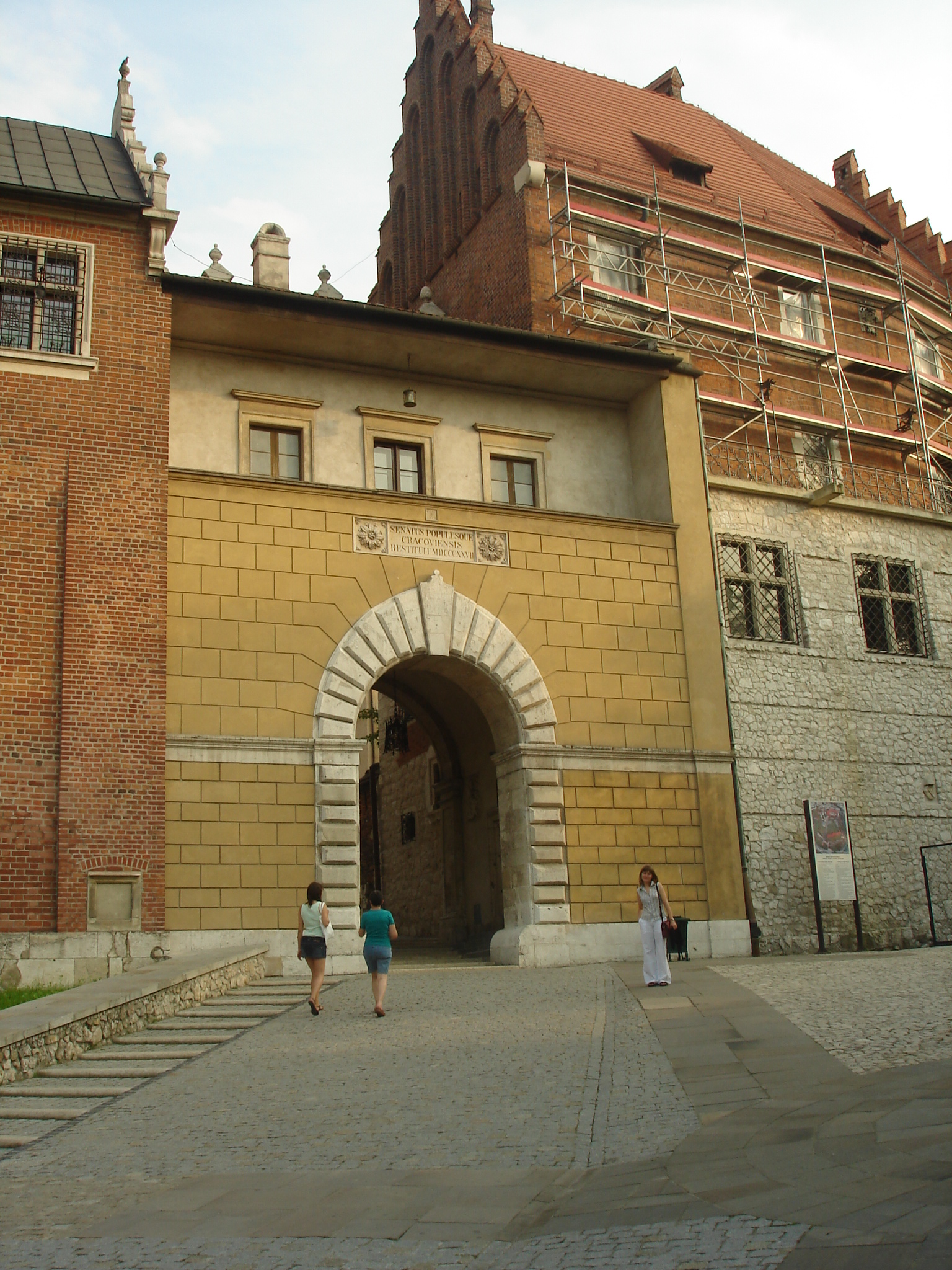
Vasa Gate at the Wawel built in 1595 by king Sigismund III to commemorate the birth of his heir.

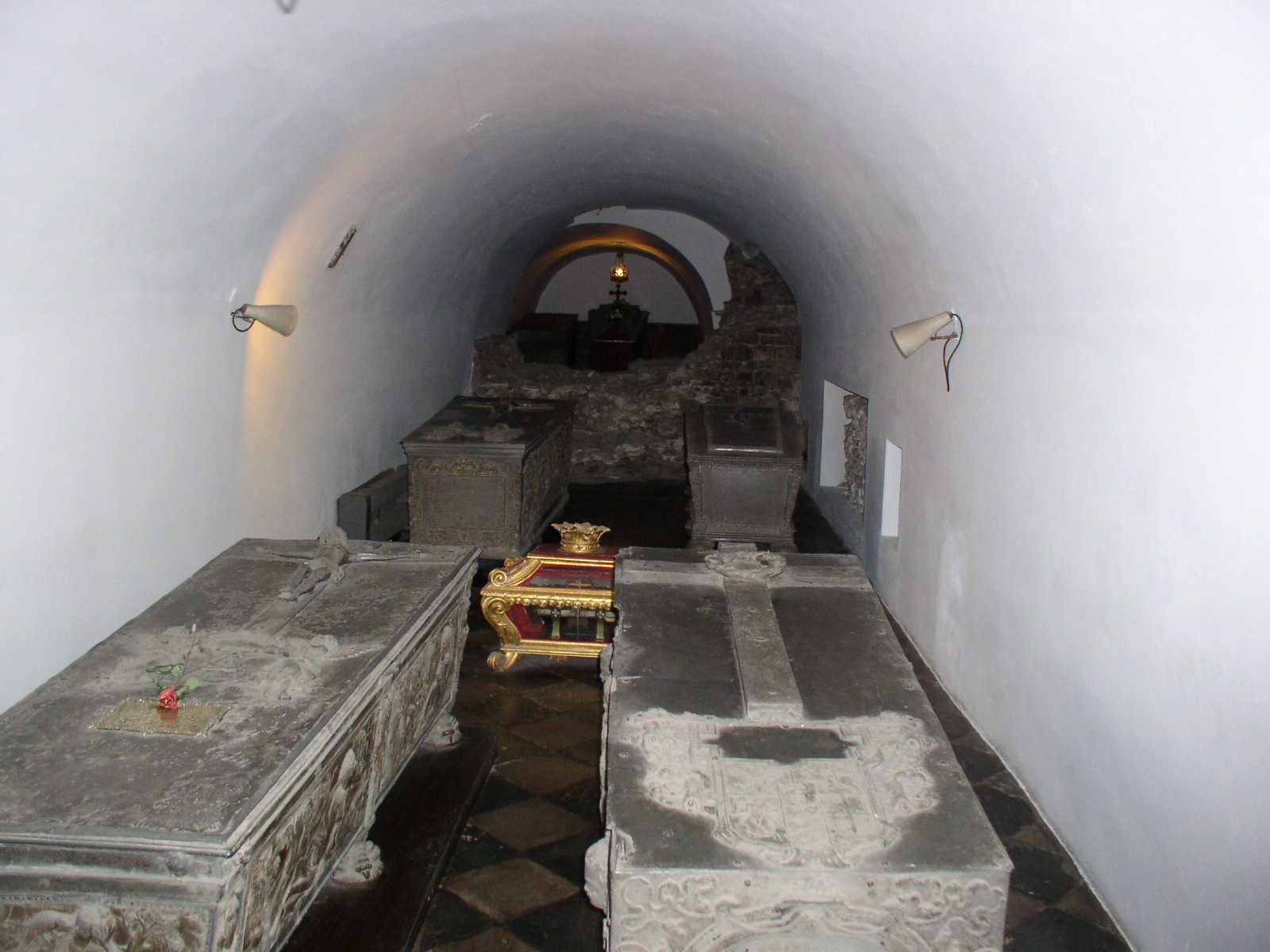
Her coffin in the Sigismund's Crypt under the Wawel Cathedral (second from the left).

Anna of Austria Born: 16 August 1573 Died: 10 February 1598
Royal titles
Preceded by Catherine of Austria	Queen consort of Poland; Grand Duchess consort of Lithuania; 1592–1598	Succeeded by Constance of Austria
Preceded by Gunilla Bielke	Queen consort of Sweden; Grand Duchess consort of Finland; 1592–1598	Succeeded by Christina of Holstein-Gottorp
