= Cecilia Renata of Austria =

Queen of Poland from 1637 to 1644

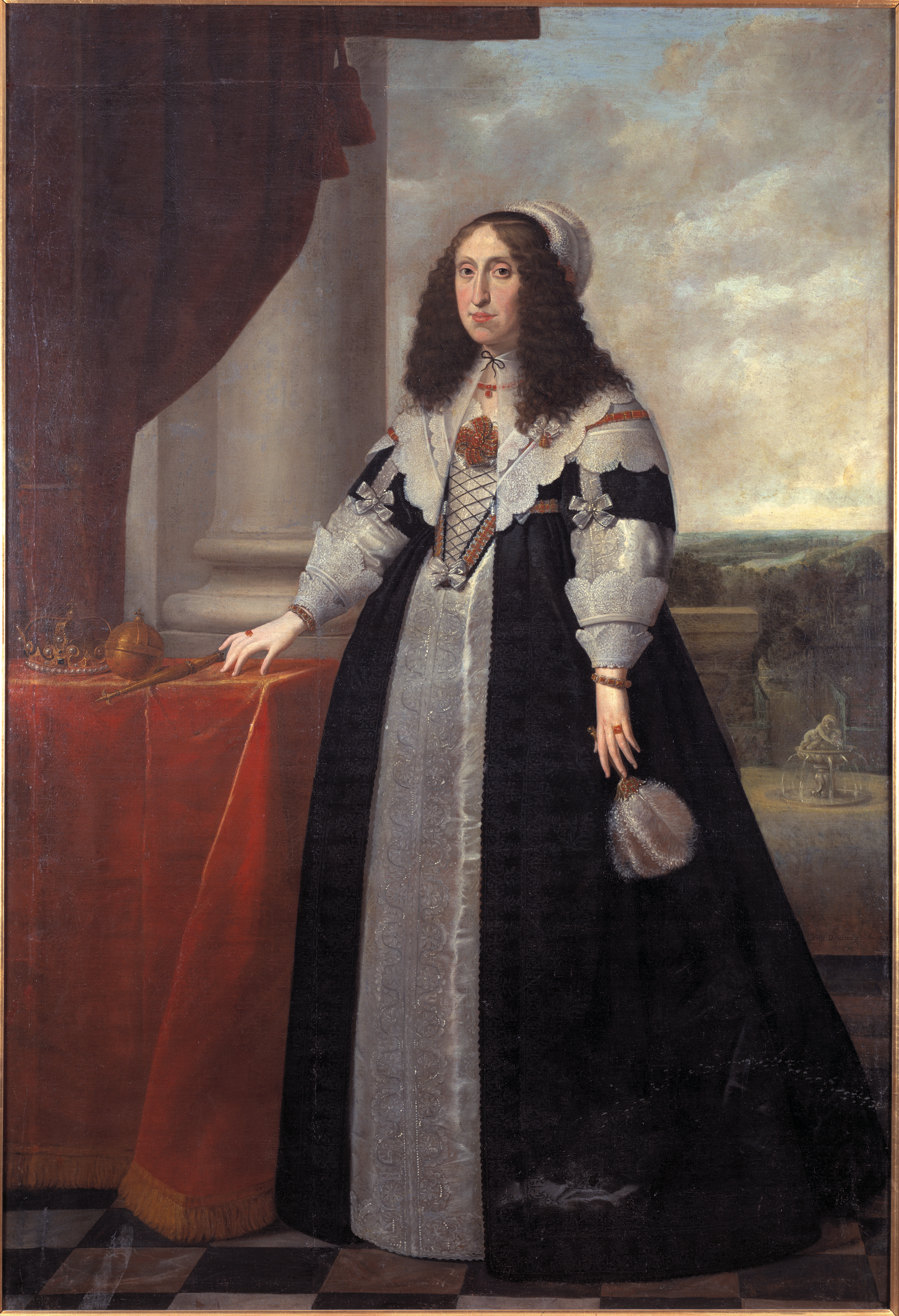
- Portrait by Peter Danckerts de Rij, 1643

Queen consort of Poland Grand Duchess consort of Lithuania
- Tenure: 12 September 1637 – 24 March 1644
- Coronation: 12 September 1637
- Born: 16 July 1611; Graz, Duchy of Styria, Holy Roman Empire
- Died: 24 March 1644 (aged 32); Vilnius, Grand Duchy of Lithuania, Polish–Lithuanian Commonwealth
- Spouse: Władysław IV Vasa (m. 1637)
- Issue: 3, including: Sigismund Casimir Maria Anna Isabella
- House: Habsburg
- Father: Ferdinand II, Holy Roman Emperor
- Mother: Maria Anna of Bavaria

Cecilia Renata of Austria (German: Cäcilie Renate, Polish: Cecylia Renata, Lithuanian: Cecilija Renata; 16 July 1611 – 24 March 1644) was Queen of Poland and Grand Duchess of Lithuania as the wife of King-Grand Duke Władysław IV Vasa.

== Selection and coronation ==
Cecilia Renata was a daughter of Holy Roman Emperor Ferdinand II, of the House of Habsburg, and Maria Anna of Bavaria. Born in 1611 in Graz, she was chosen as a bride by the Polish-Lithuanian nobility. She married Władysław on 9 August in Vienna by proxy, and then in Warsaw in person on 12 September 1637, and the same day was crowned at St. John's Cathedral. This was the first royal coronation outside of Kraków, the historic, former capital of Poland, and this greatly angered the Polish nobility. A law was instigated to reserve coronations to Kraków in 1638.

== Queenship ==
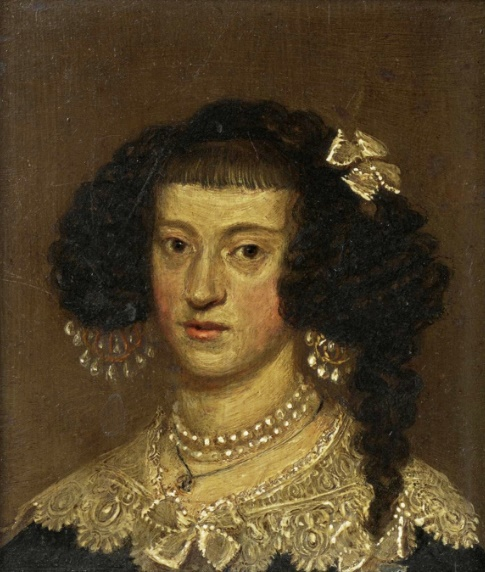
Portrait miniature by Frans Luycx, c. 1640

Young and energetic, Queen Cecilia Renata soon began organising the royal court to her liking. She was popular, especially for her politeness. One noble wrote in his memoirs that she insisted other women sit with her, even though she was queen. Cecilia Renata could not remove her husband's mistress, Hedwig Łuszkowska, by herself, so she arranged a marriage between Hedwig and Starosta Merecki, John Wypyski. In 1638, Cecilia Renata and Władysław visited Vienna.

Cecilia Renata advocated the Habsburg and pro-Catholic point of view and allied herself with the pro-Habsburg faction of Chancellor Jerzy Ossoliński and pro-Catholic Albrycht Stanisław Radziwiłł. Her political opponent at the court was the faction of Adam Kazanowski, whose influence over King Władysław, his childhood friend, diminished after her marriage. Kazanowski was allied with Chancellor Piotr Gembicki, who thus became one of her opponents. Her influence was strong for the first 2–3 years of marriage, and she had much to say about the royal nominations for important official positions. After 1638/1639 when Władysław realised that Habsburgs were prepared to give him little assistance, her power waned, and he started to disregard her advice.

Cecilia Renata kept in contact with her brothers and continued an intimate attachment with them; she also became friends with her sister-in-law Anna Catherine. She enjoyed music, concerts, and theatre performances and this may have greatly influenced her husband, who was one of the founders of Polish national theatre and brought many famous and well-known artists and performers from all around Europe to the country.

== Pregnancies and death ==
During her marriage, she became pregnant three times:

- Sigismund Casimir (1 April 1640 – 9 August 1647)
- Maria Anna Isabella (8 January 1642 – 7 February 1642)
- Stillborn child (23 March 1644), son according to one source, daughter according to the other.

Cecilia Renata died the day after delivering a stillborn child as a consequence of an infection, likely related to the childbirth. Following her sudden death, Cecilia Renata was deeply mourned by both Władysław and the Royal Polish-Lithuanian court. She also left a good impression on the public, mostly for her piety and goodwill.

== Ancestry ==
Ancestors of Cecilia Renata of Austria

8. Ferdinand I, Holy Roman Emperor
4. Charles II, Archduke of Austria
9. Anna of Bohemia and Hungary
2. Ferdinand II, Holy Roman Emperor
10. Albert V, Duke of Bavaria (= 12)
5. Maria Anna of Bavaria
11. Anna of Austria (= 13)
1. Cecilia Renata of Austria
12. Albert V, Duke of Bavaria (= 10)
6. William V, Duke of Bavaria
13. Anna of Austria (= 11)
3. Maria Anna of Bavaria
14. Francis I, Duke of Lorraine
7. Renata of Lorraine
15. Christina of Denmark

== See also ==
- Kazimierzowski Palace

Cecilia Renata of Austria House of Habsburg Born: 16 July 1611 Died: 24 March 1644
Royal titles
Preceded by Constance of Austria	Queen consort of Poland; Grand Duchess consort of Lithuania; 1637–1644	Succeeded by Marie Louise Gonzaga
