= Władysław IV Vasa =

Ruler of Poland–Lithuania from 1632 to 1648

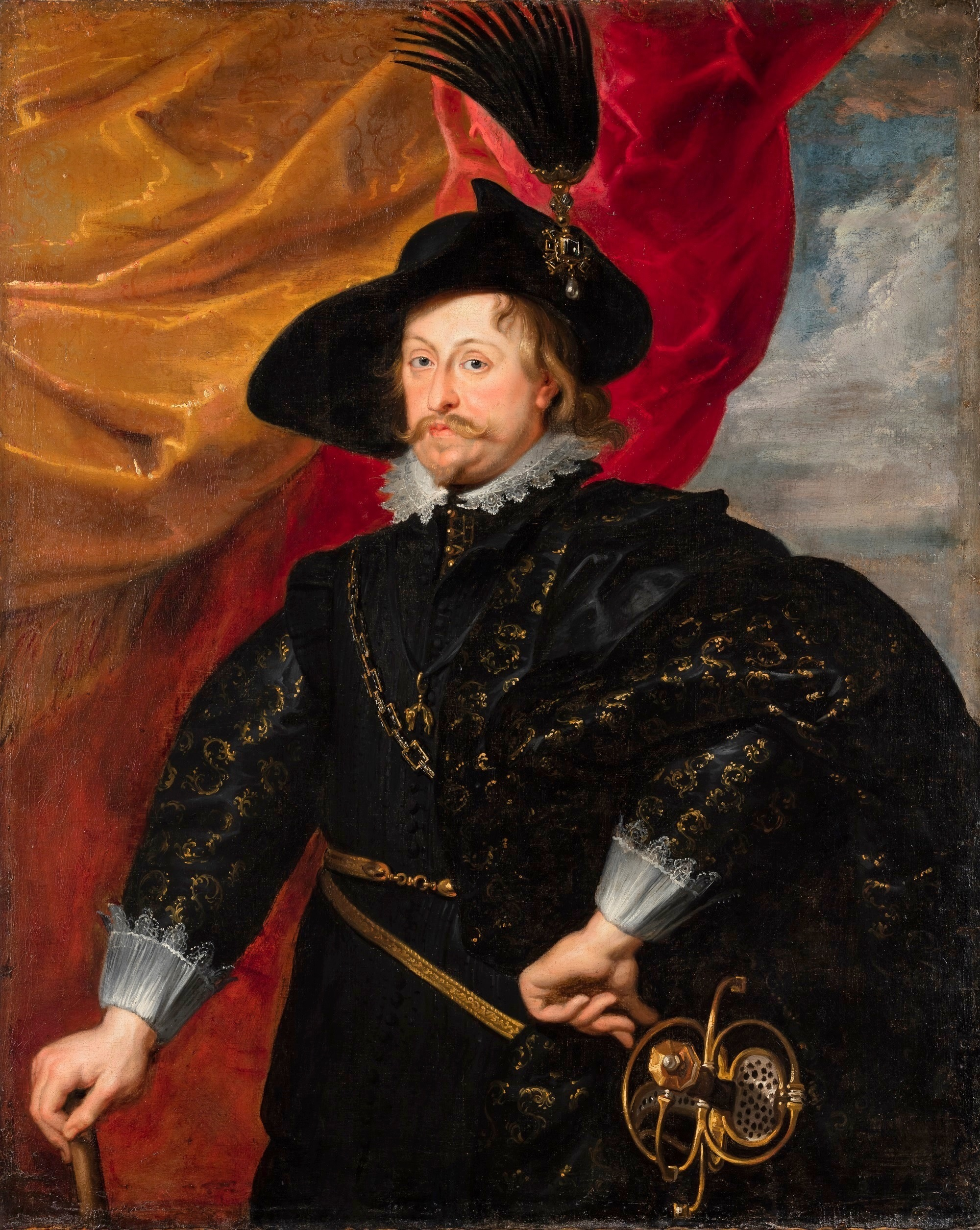
- Portrait by Peter Paul Rubens (1620s)

King of Poland Grand Duke of Lithuania
- Reign: 8 November 1632 – 20 May 1648
- Coronation: 6 February 1633
- Predecessor: Sigismund III Vasa
- Successor: John II Casimir Vasa

Tsar of Russia (disputed)
- Reign: 29 July [O.S. 19 July] 1610 – 3 March [O.S. 21 February] 1613
- Predecessor: Vasili IV
- Successor: Michael I
- Born: 9 June 1595; Łobzów (present-day Kraków), Poland, Polish–Lithuanian Commonwealth
- Died: 20 May 1648 (aged 52); Merkinė, Lithuania, Polish–Lithuanian Commonwealth
- Burial: Wawel Cathedral, Kraków, Vilnius Cathedral, Vilnius (heart).
- Spouses: Cecilia Renata of Austria (m. 1637; died 1644) Marie Louise Gonzaga (m. 1646)
- Issue Detail: Sigismund Casimir Vasa; Maria Anna Isabella; Władysław Konstanty Vasa (illegitimate)
- House: Vasa
- Father: Sigismund III Vasa
- Mother: Anne of Austria
- Religion: Roman Catholicism
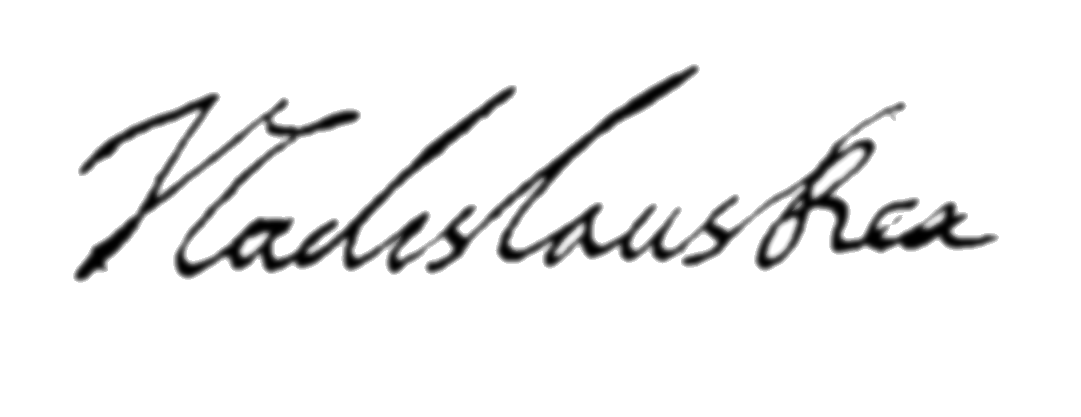
- Signature

Władysław IV Vasa (Note: Polish: Władysław IV Waza; Lithuanian: Vladislovas Vaza; Swedish: Vladislav IV av Polen; Russian: Владислав IV Ваза, romanized: Vladislav IV Vaza; Latin: Ladislaus IV Vasa) or Ladislaus IV (9 June 1595 – 20 May 1648) was King of Poland, Grand Duke of Lithuania and claimant of the thrones of Sweden and Russia. Born into the House of Vasa as a prince of Poland and of Sweden, Władysław IV was the eldest son of Sigismund III Vasa and his first wife, Anna of Austria.

Władysław was elected as the tsar of Russia by the Seven Boyars in 1610, when the Polish army captured Moscow, but did not assume the throne because of his father's position and a popular uprising. Nevertheless, until 1634, he used the titular title of grand duke of Moscow. Following his election as king of Poland and grand duke of Lithuania in 1632, he was largely successful in defending the Polish–Lithuanian Commonwealth against foreign invasion, most notably in the Smolensk War of 1632–1634 in which he participated personally.

He supported religious tolerance and carried out military reforms, such as the founding of the Commonwealth Navy. Władysław was also a renowned patron of the arts and music. He gained fame by defeating the Ottoman Empire, strengthening royal power, and reforming the Commonwealth's political system, although he failed at reclaiming the Swedish throne. Despite that failure, his personal charisma and popularity among all segments of society contributed to relative internal calm in the Commonwealth.

He died without a legitimate son and was succeeded to the Polish-Lithuanian throne by his half-brother, John II Casimir Vasa. Władysław's death marked the end of relative stability in the Polish–Lithuanian Commonwealth, as conflicts and tensions that had been growing over several decades came to a head with devastating consequences. The Khmelnytsky Uprising in the east (1648) and the subsequent Swedish invasion ("the Deluge", 1655–1660) weakened the country and diminished Poland's status as a regional power. For that reason, Władysław's reign was seen in the following decades as a bygone golden era of stability and prosperity.

== Life ==
Władysław IV's father, Sigismund III Vasa, grandson of Sweden's King Gustav I, had succeeded his father to the Swedish throne in 1592, only to be deposed in 1599 by his uncle, subsequently King Charles IX. This resulted in a long-standing feud, with the Commonwealth's kings of the House of Vasa claiming the Swedish throne. This led to the Polish–Swedish War of 1600–1629 and later to the Deluge of 1655.

=== Childhood ===
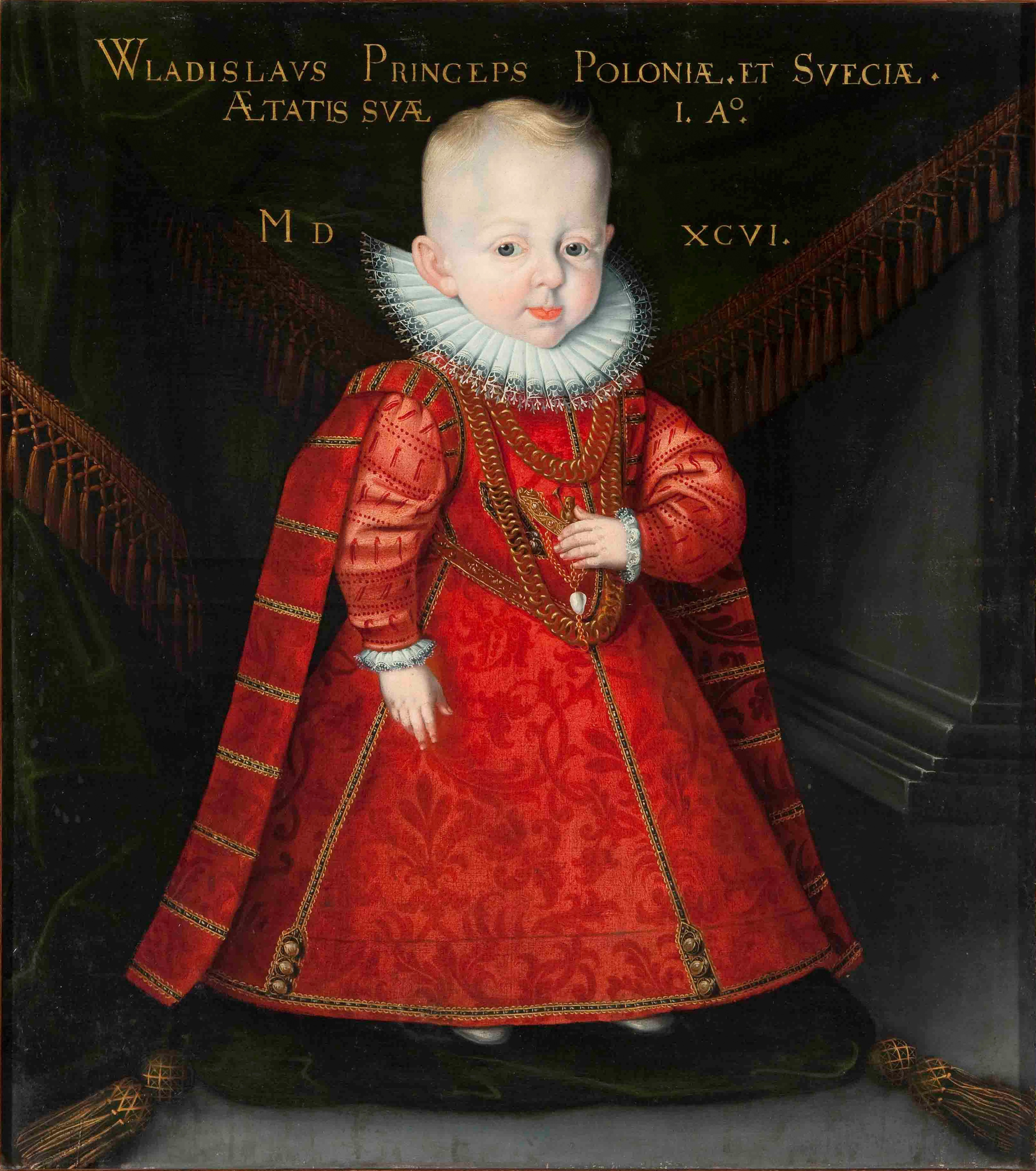
Władysław in 1596. Painting by Martin Kober

The marriage of Anne of Austria to Sigismund III was a traditional, politically motivated marriage, intended to tie the young House of Vasa to the prestigious Habsburgs. Władysław was born 9 June 1595 at the King's summer residence in Łobzów, near Kraków, a few months after the main Wawel Castle had been consumed by fire.

Władysław's mother died on 10 February 1598, less than three years after giving birth to him. He was raised by one of her former ladies of the court, Urszula Meierin, who eventually became a powerful player at the royal court, with much influence.

Władysław's Hofmeister was Michał Konarski, a Polish-Prussian noble. Around the early 17th century, Urszula lost much of her influence, as Władysław gained new teachers and mentors, including such priests as Marek Łętkowski, Gabriel Prowancjusz, and Andrzej Szołdrski and in military matters by Zygmunt Kazanowski.

Much of his curriculum was likely designed by Father Piotr Skarga, much respected by Sigismund III. Władysław studied for several years in the Kraków Academy, and for two years, in Rome.

At the age of 10, he received his own prince court. He formed a friendship with brothers Adam and Stanisław Kazanowski. It was reported that young Władysław was interested in the arts; later, this led to him becoming an important patron of the arts. He spoke and wrote in German, Italian and Latin.

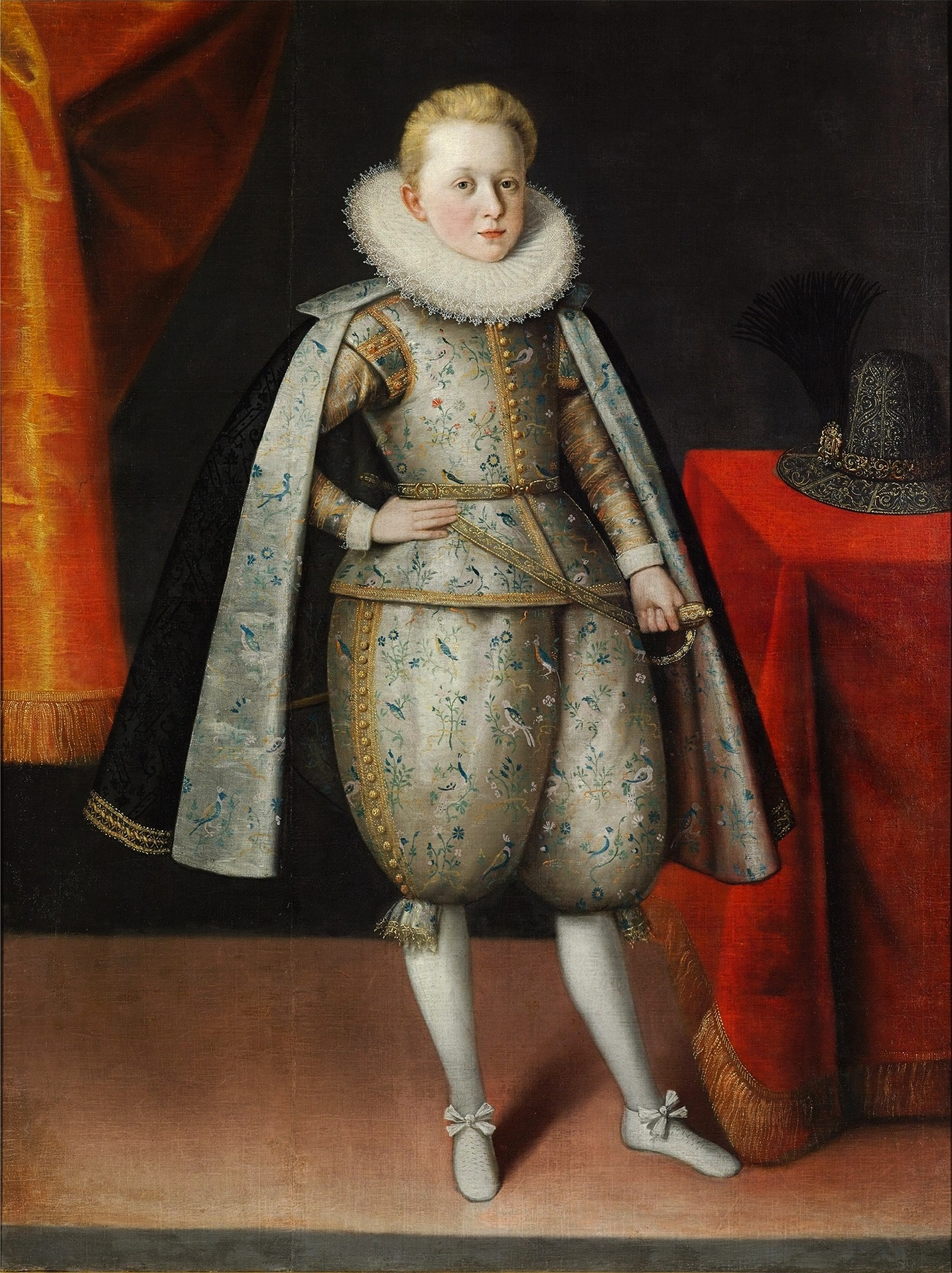
Prince Władysław, aged about 10, c. 1605

Władysław was liked by the szlachta (Polish-Lithuanian nobility), but his father's plans to secure him the Polish-Lithuanian throne (vivente rege) were unpopular and eventually crushed in the Zebrzydowski Rebellion (rokosz).

=== Tsar ===
With the intensification of the Polish intervention in Russia, in 1609, the royal family moved to their residence in Vilnius, capital of the Grand Duchy of Lithuania, where he witnessed the fire of Vilnius, which required the royal family to evacuate from Vilnius Castle. Later that year, Władysław, aged 15, was elected as tsar by Russia's aristocracy council of Seven boyars, who overthrew tsar Vasily Shuysky during the Time of Troubles.

His election was ruined by his father, Sigismund III, who aimed to convert Russia's population from the Eastern Orthodox religion to Roman Catholicism. Sigismund refused to agree to the boyar's request to send Prince Władysław to Moscow and his conversion to Orthodoxy. Instead, Sigismund proposed that he should reign as a regent in Russia instead. This unrealistic proposal led to a resumption of hostilities. In 1611-1612, silver and gold coins (kopecks) were prematurely struck in the Russian mints in Moscow and Novgorod with Władysław's titulary Tsar and Grand Prince Vladislav Zigimontovych of all Russia.

Władysław tried to regain the tsar's throne himself, organising a campaign in 1616. Despite some military victories, he was unable to capture Moscow. The Commonwealth gained some disputed territories in the Truce of Deulino, but Władysław was never able to reign in Russia; the throne during this time was instead held by tsar Michael Romanov. He held on to the title,^{[a]} without any real power, until 1634.

Likely, the failure of this campaign showed Władysław the limits of royal power in the Polish-Lithuanian Commonwealth, as major factors for the failure included the significant autonomy of the military commanders, which did not see Władysław as their superior, and a lack of funds for the army, as the Commonwealth's parliament (sejm) refused to subsidize the war.

=== Prince ===
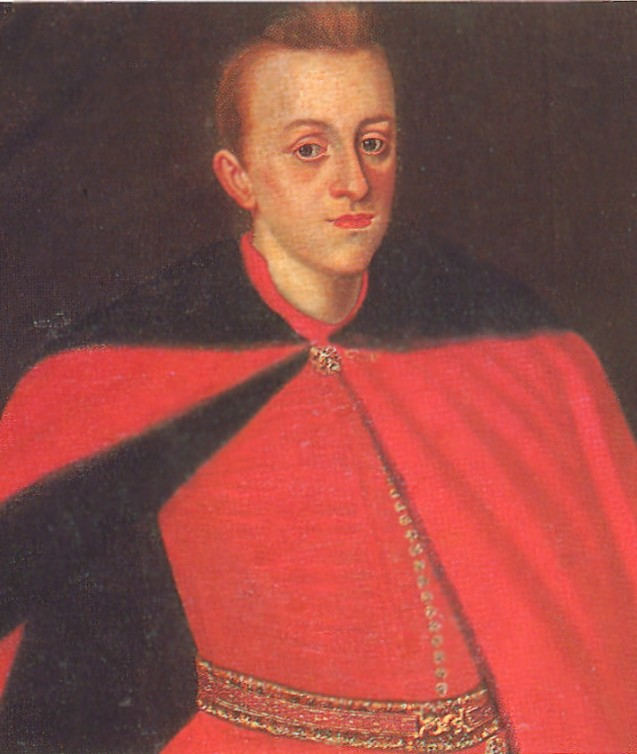
Young Władysław

Before he was elected king of the Commonwealth, Władysław fought in many campaigns, seeking personal glory. After his final campaign against the Russians in 1617–1618 (the end of the Dymitriads), he went to Silesia in 1619 looking for an opportunity to aid the Habsburgs in their struggle against the Czech Hussites in the Thirty Years' War, an opportunity that never materialized.

In 1620, he took part in the second phase of the Polish–Ottoman War, a consequence of the long series of struggles between Poland and the Ottomans over Moldavia. In 1621, he was a Polish commander at Chocim. He reportedly was stricken with illness, but despite that, he proved a voice of reason, convincing other Polish commanders to stay and fight. His advice was correct, and the battle eventually ended with a peace treaty that returned the status quo from before the Ottoman invasion. This peace treaty also gave Władysław an international reputation as a "defender of the Christian faith" and increased his popularity in the Commonwealth itself.

In 1623, while near Gdańsk (Danzig), he witnessed Gustavus Adolphus's Swedish Navy use its naval superiority to demand concessions from Gdańsk (the Commonwealth had no navy).

In 1624, King Sigismund decided that the time had come for Władysław to travel, like many of his peers, to Western Europe. For security reasons, Władysław travelled under a fake name, Snopkowski (from Polish Snopek, meaning sheaf, as seen in the Vasa's coat of arms). On the long voyage (1624–1625), he was accompanied by Albrycht Stanisław Radziwiłł and other courtiers.

First, he travelled to Wrocław (Breslau), then Munich, where he met Maximilian I, Elector of Bavaria. In Brussels he met Infanta Isabella Clara Eugenia of Spain; in Antwerp, Rubens. Near Breda he met Ambrosio Spinola. It was during his stay with Spinola that he was impressed by Western military techniques; this was later reflected when he became king, as military matters were always important to him.

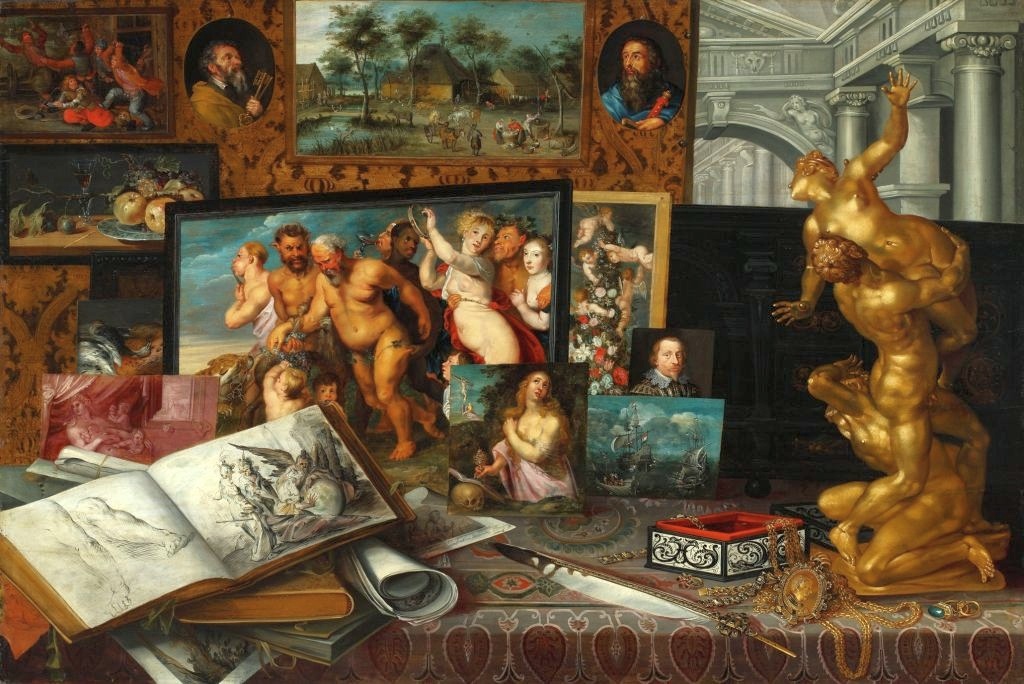
Art Collection of Prince Władysław Vasa (Royal Castle in Warsaw), according to the artist's signature painted in Warsaw in 1626, depicts treasures purchased by the Prince during his journey across Europe.

While not a military genius and surpassed by his contemporary, Commonwealth Hetman Stanisław Koniecpolski, Władysław was known as a fairly skillful commander on his own. In Rome, he was welcomed by Pope Urban VIII, who congratulated him on his fighting against the Ottomans. During his stay in Florence, he was impressed by opera and decided to bring this form of art to the Commonwealth, where it was previously unknown.

In Genoa and Venice, he was impressed by the local shipyards, and in Pisa he witnessed a specially organized mock naval battle, experiences that resulted in his later attempt to create the Polish–Lithuanian Commonwealth Navy.

After returning to Poland, he fought in 1626 against the Swedes in the last phase of the Polish–Swedish War, where he took part in the battle of Gniew. His involvement in this conflict, which lasted till the Truce of Altmark in 1629, was rather limited, and he spent much time in other parts of the country.

During that period and afterwards, he lobbied for support for his candidature for the Polish-Lithuanian throne, as his father, Sigismund, was getting more advanced in his age, and the succession to the throne did not occur through inheritance but rather through the process of royal elections. While Władysław and his father tried to ensure Władysław's election during Sigismund's lifetime, this was not a popular option for the nobility, and it repeatedly failed, up to and including the Sejm of 1631.

Sigismund suffered a sudden stroke (Note: Historian Władysław Czapliński claimed that Sigismund's death resulted from a heart attack, however, witnesses recorded that the king "lay paralysed" and died of a stroke.) in late April 1632 and died in the morning hours of 30 April, forcing the matter to be raised again.

=== Reign ===
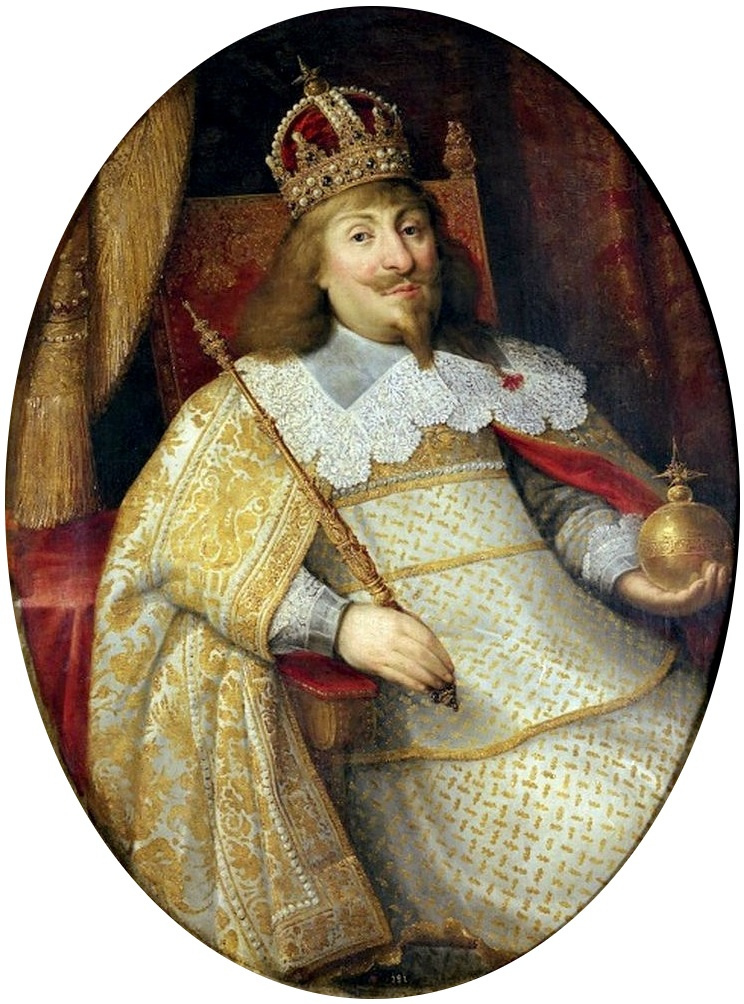
Władysław in coronation robes

The election sejm of 1632 eventually chose Władysław; there were no other serious contenders. The decision was reached on 8 November, but as the pacta conventa were not yet ready, the official announcement was delayed until 13 November. In the pacta conventa, Władysław pledged himself to fund a military school and equipment; to find a way to fund a navy; to maintain current alliances; not to raise armies, give offices or military ranks to foreigners, negotiate peace treaties, or declare war without the Sejm's approval; not to take a wife without the Senate's approval; to convince his brothers to take an oath to the Commonwealth; and to transfer the profits from the Royal Mint to the Royal Treasury rather than to a private treasury. When the election result was announced by the Crown Grand Marshal, Łukasz Opaliński, the szlachta (nobility), who had taken part in the election, began festivities in honor of the new king, which lasted three hours. Władysław was crowned in the Wawel Cathedral, in Kraków on 6 February in the following year.

==== Military campaigns ====
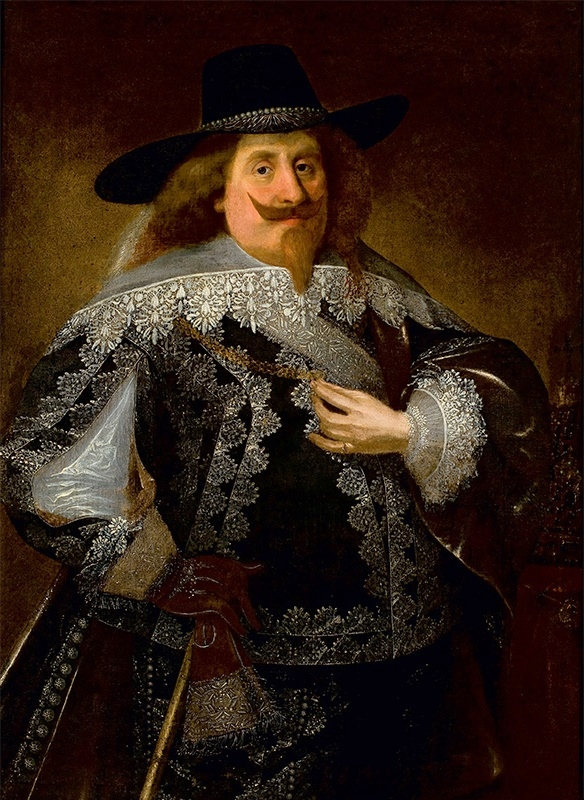
Władysław IV, by Pieter Soutman, c. 1634

In an attempt to take advantage of the confusion expected after the death of the Commonwealth's king, Tsar Michael I of Russia invaded the Commonwealth. A Muscovite army crossed Lithuania's eastern frontier in October 1632 and laid siege to Smolensk (which was ceded to Lithuania by Russia in 1618, at the end of the Dymitriad wars). In the war against Russia in 1632–1634 (the Smolensk War), Władysław broke the siege in September 1633 and then, in turn, surrounded the Russian army under Mikhail Shein, which was then forced to surrender on 1 March 1634.

During that campaign, Władysław started the modernisation program of the Commonwealth army, emphasising the usage of modern infantry and artillery. Władysław proved to be a good tactician, and his innovations in the use of artillery and fortifications based on Western ideas greatly contributed to the eventual Polish–Lithuanian success. King Władysław wanted to continue the war or, because the Polish–Swedish Treaty of Altmark would soon be expiring, ally with the Russians to strike against Sweden. However, the Sejm wanted no more conflict. As Stanisław Łubieński, the Bishop of Płock, wrote two weeks after Shein's surrender: "Our happiness is in remaining within our borders, guaranteeing health and well-being." The resulting Peace of Polyanov (Treaty of Polanów), favourable to Poland-Lithuania, confirmed the pre-war territorial status quo. Muscovy also agreed to pay 20,000 rubles in exchange for Wladyslaw's renunciation of all claims to the tsardom and return of the royal insignia, which were in the Commonwealth's possession since the Dymitriads.

Following the Smolensk campaign, the Commonwealth was threatened by another attack by the Ottoman Empire. During the wars against Ottomans in 1633–1634, Władysław moved the Commonwealth army south of the border with Russia, where, under the command of the hetman Stanisław Koniecpolski, it forced the Turks to renew a peace treaty. In the resulting treaty, both countries agreed again to curb the border raids by Cossacks and the Tatars, and the Ottomans confirmed that the Commonwealth to be an independent power, and had not to pay tribute to the Empire.

After the southern campaign, the Commonwealth had to deal with a threat from the north, as the armistice, ending the Polish–Swedish War (1600–1629), was expiring. The majority of Polish nobles preferred to solve the problem through negotiations, unwilling to pay taxes for a new war, provided that Sweden was open to negotiations and concessions (in particular, to retreat from the occupied Polish coastal territories). Władysław himself was hoping for a war, which could yield some more significant territorial gains, and even managed to gather a sizeable army, with navy elements, near the disputed territories. Sweden, weakened by involvement in the Thirty Years' War, was however open to a peaceful solution. Władysław could not go against the decision of the Sejm and Senate, and agreed to support the treaty. Thus, both sides agreed to sign the Armistice of Stuhmsdorf (Sztumska Wieś) on 12 September 1635, favourable to the Commonwealth, which regained the Prussian territories, and called for a reduction of the Swedish tolls on the maritime trade.

==== Politics ====
Polish–Lithuanian Commonwealth during the reign of Władysław IV, ca. 1635

In the three months between his election and coronation, Władysław sounded the waters regarding the possibility of a peaceful succession to the Swedish throne, following the recent death of Gustavus Adolphus, but this, as well as his proposal to mediate between Sweden and its enemies, was rejected, primarily by the Swedish chancellor and head of the regency council, Axel Oxenstierna.

Władysław IV owed nominal allegiance to the Imperial Habsburgs as a member of the Order of the Golden Fleece. His relationship with the Habsburgs was relatively strong; although he was not above carrying on negotiations with their enemies, like France, he refused Cardinal Richelieu's 1635 proposal of an alliance and a full-out war against them, despite the potential lure of territorial gains in Silesia. He realised that such a move would cause much unrest in a heavily Catholic Commonwealth, that he likely lacked the authority and power to push such a change of policy through the Sejm, and that the resulting conflict would be very difficult. From 1636 onward, for the next few years, Władysław strengthened his ties with the Habsburgs.

In the meantime, Władysław still tried to take a leading role in European politics and negotiate a peaceful settlement to the Thirty Years' War, a settlement which he hoped would ease his way into regaining the Swedish crown. Following the armistice of Stuhmsdorf, Władysław came to increasingly realize that his prospects for regaining the Swedish throne were dim. In the years 1636–1638, he proposed several reforms to strengthen his and his dynasty's power in the Commonwealth. His first plan was an attempt to secure a hereditary province within the country, which would not be threatened by the possible power shift following a future royal election; this, however, did not gain sufficient support in the Sejm. Next, Władysław attempted to create an order of chivalry, similar to the Order of the Golden Fleece, but this plan was scuttled down as well, with the szlachta and the magnates seeing this as an attempt to create a royal, loyalist elite, and traditionally opposing anything that could lead to the reduction of their extensive power. Popular vote and opposition also resulted in the failure of the plan to raise taxes from trade tariffs; here it was not only the nobility but even the merchants and burghers from towns, like Gdańsk (Danzig) who were able to muster enough support (including from foreign powers) to stop the king's reforms. In fact, the defeat of his plans was so total, that he was forced to make certain conciliatory gestures to the nobility, as the Sejm passed several laws constraining his authority (such as to hire foreign troops), further indicating the limits of royal power in the Commonwealth.

Władysław IV Vasa vested several localities with town rights, including Krzeszów, Szlichtyngowa, Ostryna, Wasiliszki, Królewiec, Olewsk, Czausy, and the Warsaw suburbs of Praga and Skaryszew.

==== Marriages ====
Portrait of Władysław IV, by Frans Luycx, c. 1640

Early in his reign, there were plans regarding a marriage of Władysław and Princess Elisabeth of Bohemia, Princess Palatine (daughter of Frederick V, Elector Palatine). This was however unpopular, both with Catholic nobles and the Catholic Church, and when it became clear to Władysław that this would not convince the Swedes to elect him to their throne, this plan, with quiet support from Władysław himself, was dropped.

Ferdinand II, Holy Roman Emperor's proposal of marriage between Władysław and Archduchess Cecilia Renata of Austria (sister of future Ferdinand III, Holy Roman Emperor) arrived in Warsaw somewhere during spring 1636. In June of that year, Władysław sent Jerzy Ossoliński to the Imperial Court, to work on improving the Imperial-Commonwealth relations. The king's trusted confessor, father Walerian Magni (of Franciscan religious order), and voivode Kasper Doenhoff arrived in Regensburg (Polish: Ratyzbona) on 26 October 1636 with consent and performed negotiations. The Archduchess' dowry was agreed for 100,000 zlotys, the Emperor also promised to pay the dowries of both of Siegmund III's wives: Anna and Konstance. Additionally, the son of Władysław and Cecilia Renata was to obtain the duchy of Opole and Racibórz in Silesia (Duchy of Opole and Racibórz). However, before everything was confirmed and signed, Ferdinand II died and Ferdinand III backed away from giving the Silesian duchy to the son of Władysław. Instead, a dowry was awarded to be secured by the Bohemian estates of Třeboň. On 16 March 1637, a "family alliance" was signed between the Habsburgs and the Polish-Lithuanian branch of the House of Vasa. Władysław promised not to sign any pacts against the Habsburgs, and to transfer his rights to the Swedish throne in case of his line's extinction; in return, Habsburg promised to support his efforts to regain the Swedish crown, and to transfer to him some territory in case of gains in a war against the Ottomans. The marriage took place in 1637, on 12 September.

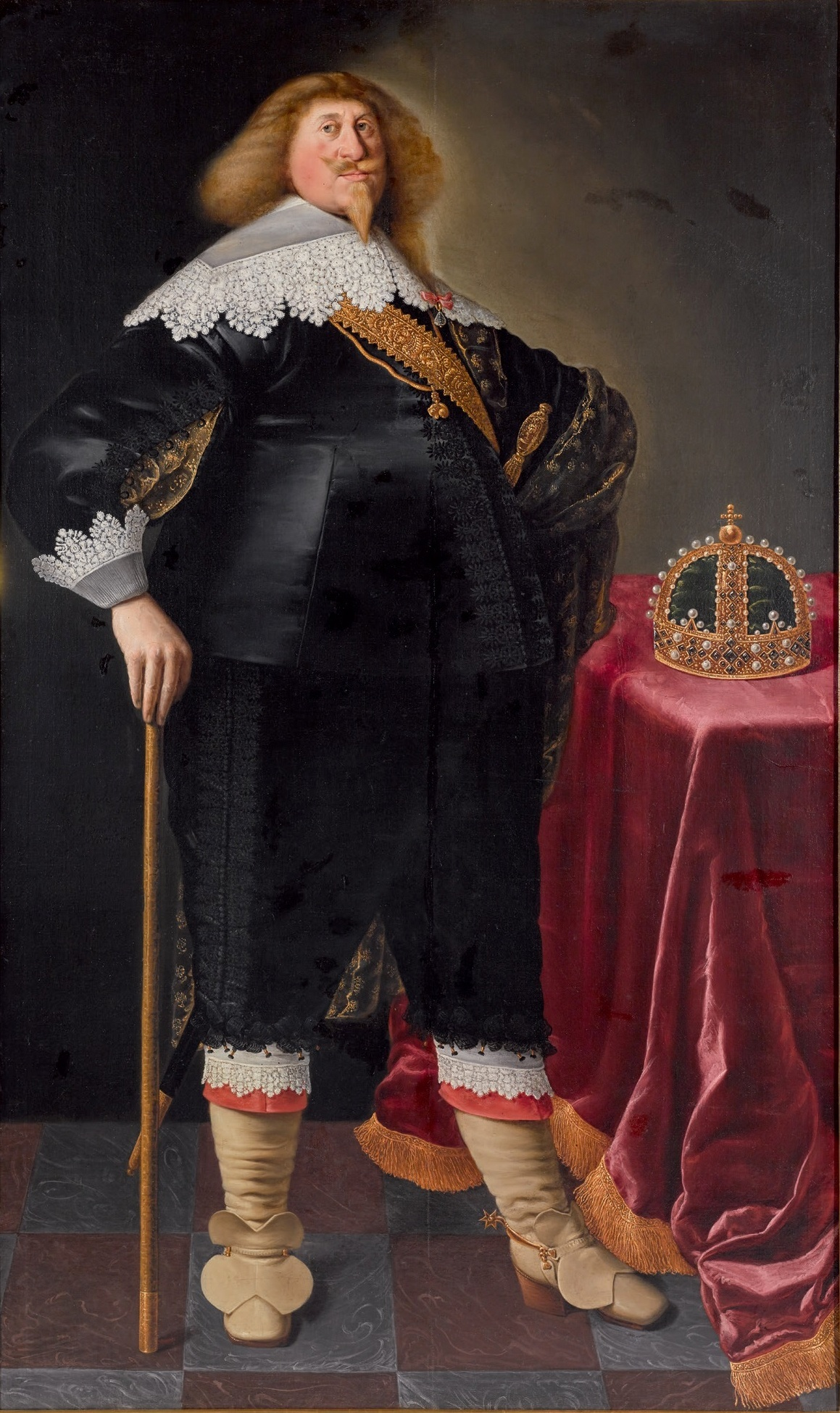
Władysław IV in later life

The next few years were similarly unsuccessful with regard to his plans. Eventually, he tried to bypass the opposition in the Sejm with secret alliances, dealings, and intrigues, but did not prove successful. Those plans included schemes such as supporting the Holy Roman Emperor's raid on Inflanty in 1639, which he hoped would lead to a war; an attempted alliance with Spain against France in 1640–1641, and in 1641–1643, with Denmark against Sweden. On the international scene, he attempted to mediate between various religious factions of Christianity, using the tolerant image of the Commonwealth to portray himself as the neutral mediator. He organized a conference in Toruń (Thorn) that began on 28 January 1645, but it failed to reach any meaningful conclusions.

After Cecilia's death in 1644, the ties between Władysław and the Habsburgs were somewhat loosened. In turn, the relations with France improved, and eventually Władysław married the French princess Ludwika Maria Gonzaga de Nevers, daughter of Charles I Gonzaga, Duke of Mantua, in 1646.

Władysław's last plan was to orchestrate a major war between the European powers and the Ottoman Empire. The border with the Empire was in a near-constant state of low-level warfare; some historians estimate that in the first half of the 17th century, Ottoman raids and wars resulted in the loss (death or enslavement) of about 300,000 Commonwealth citizens in the borderlands. The war, Władysław hoped, would also solve the problem of unrest among the Cossacks, a militant group living in Ukraine, near the Ottoman border, who could find worth in such a campaign, and turn their attention to fighting for the Commonwealth, instead of against it. As usual, he failed to inspire the nobility, rarely willing to consider sponsoring another war, to agree to this plan. He received more support from foreign powers, from Rome, Venice and Muscovy. With the promise of funds for the war, Władysław started recruiting troops among the Cossacks in 1646. The opposition of the Sejm, demanding that he dismiss the troops, coupled with Władysław's worsening health, crippled that plan as well. Władysław still did not give up, and attempted to resurrect the plan in 1647, and with the support of magnate Jeremi Wiśniowiecki (who organized military exercises near the Ottoman border), attempted unsuccessfully to provoke the Ottomans to attack.

On 9 August 1647, his young son, Sigismund Casimir, then seven years old, suddenly fell ill and died; the death of his only legitimate heir to the throne was a major blow to the king, whose grief prevented his attendance at the boy's funeral held in Kraków.^{[b]}

==== Death ====
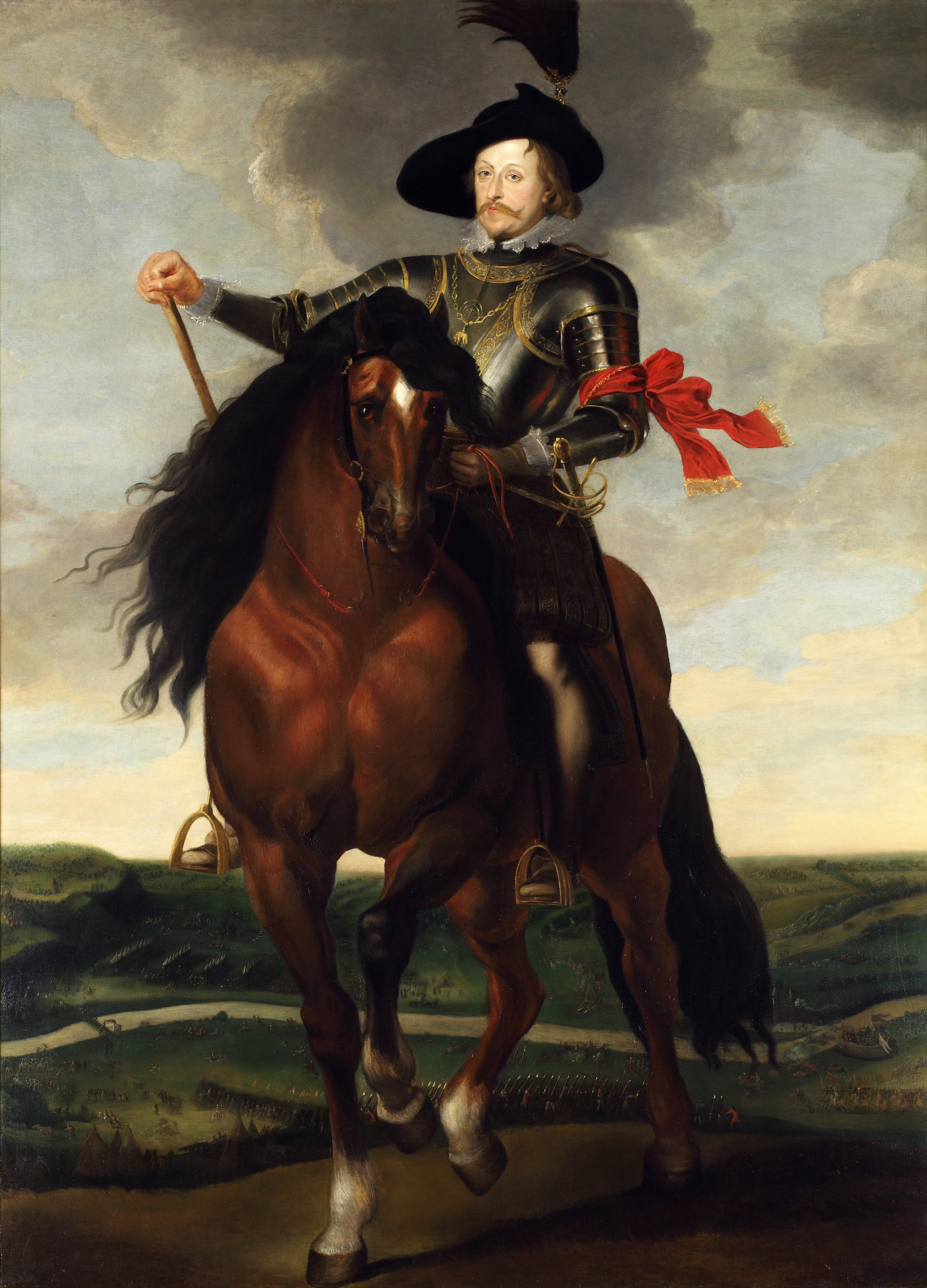
Władysław IV on Horseback, Rubens' studio

While hunting near Merkinė in early 1648, Władysław suffered from a case of gallstones or kidney stones.^{[c]} The King's condition supposedly worsened as he was given the incorrect medication to treat the ailment. Being aware that these might be his final days, the King had his last will dictated and then received his last rites. Władysław died around 02:00 at night on 20 May 1648.

His heart and viscera were interred in the Chapel of St. Casimir of Vilnius Cathedral. As he had no legitimate male heirs, he was succeeded by his half-brother John II Casimir Vasa.

==== Character ====
Władysław has been described as outgoing and friendly, with a sense of humor, optimistic, a "people's person", and able to charm many of those who interacted with him. On the other hand, he had a short temper and when angered, could act without considering all consequences.

Władysław was criticized for being a spendthrift; he lived lavishly, spending more than his royal court treasury could afford. He also dispensed much wealth among his courtiers, who were seen by people farther from the court as taking advantage of the king. He has also been known to maintain several mistresses throughout his life, including during his married period.

==== Patronage ====
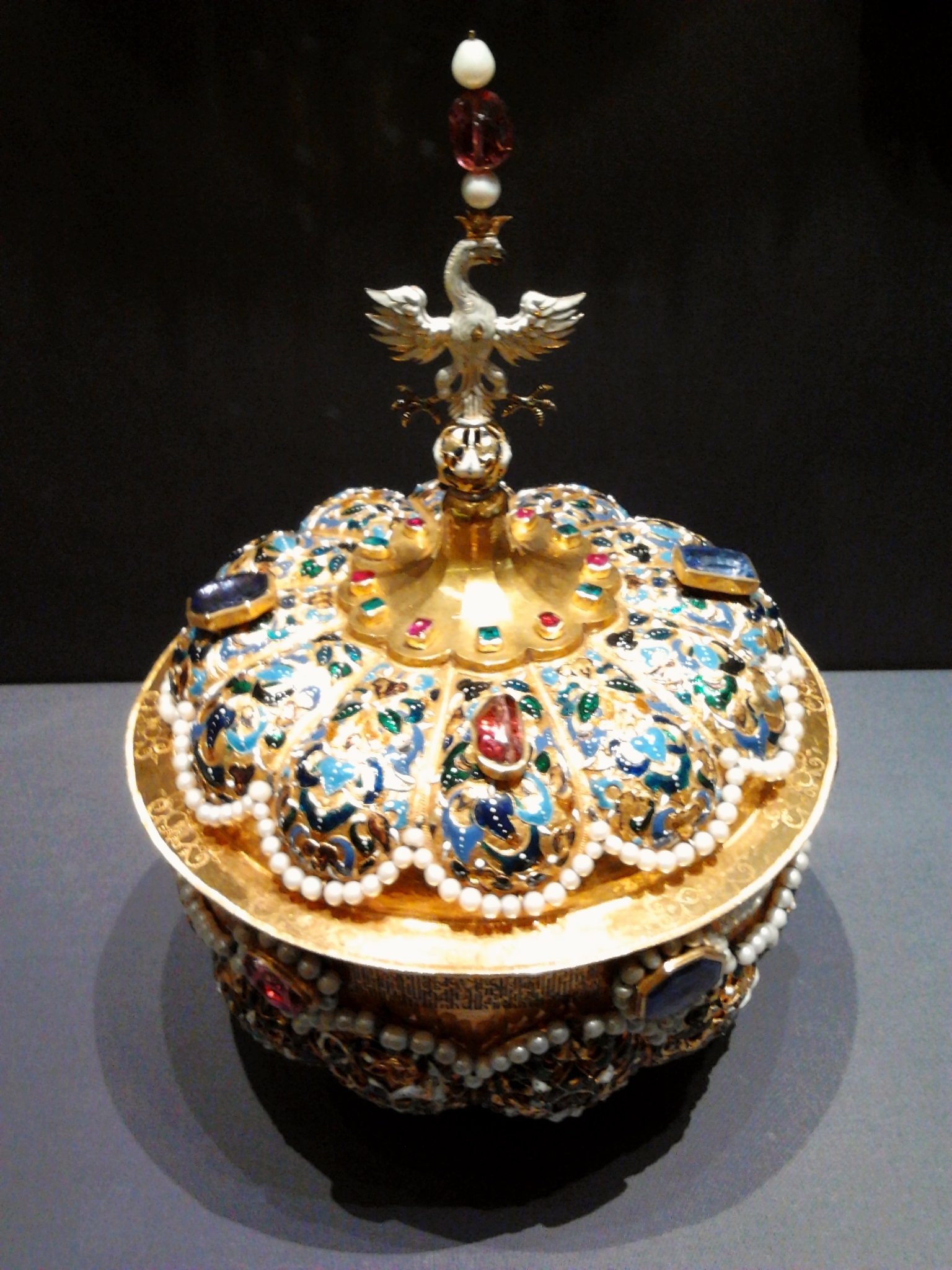
Loving cup of King Władysław IV, held at the Kunsthistorisches Museum in Vienna

One of the king's most substantial achievements was in the cultural sphere; he became a notable patron of the arts. Władysław was a connoisseur of the arts, in particular, theater and music. He spoke several languages and enjoyed reading historical literature and poetry. He collected paintings and created a notable gallery of paintings in the Warsaw Royal Castle. Władysław assembled an important collection of Italian and Flemish Baroque paintings, much of which were lost in the wars after his death. He sponsored many musicians and in 1637, created the first amphitheater in the palace, the first theater in Poland, where during his reign, dozens of operas and ballets were performed. He is credited with bringing the very genre of opera to Poland. Władysław's attention to theater contributed to the spread of this art form in Poland. He was also interested in poetry, as well as in cartography and historical and scientific works; he corresponded with Galileo.

Notable painters and engravers Władysław supported and who attended his royal court included Peter Paul Rubens, Tommaso Dolabella, Peter Danckerts de Rij, Wilhelm Hondius, Bartłomiej Strobel, and Christian Melich. His royal orchestra was headed by kapellmeister Marco Scacchi, seconded by Bartłomiej Pękiel.

One of the most renowned works he ordered was the raising of the Sigismund's Column in Warsaw. The column, dedicated to his father, was designed by the Italian-born architect Constantino Tencalla and the sculptor Clemente Molli, and cast by Daniel Tym. He was less interested in decorative architecture; he supported the construction of two palaces in Warsaw – Kazanowski Palace and Villa Regia. Among other works sponsored by or dedicated to him is Guido Reni's The Rape of Europa.

== Assessment ==
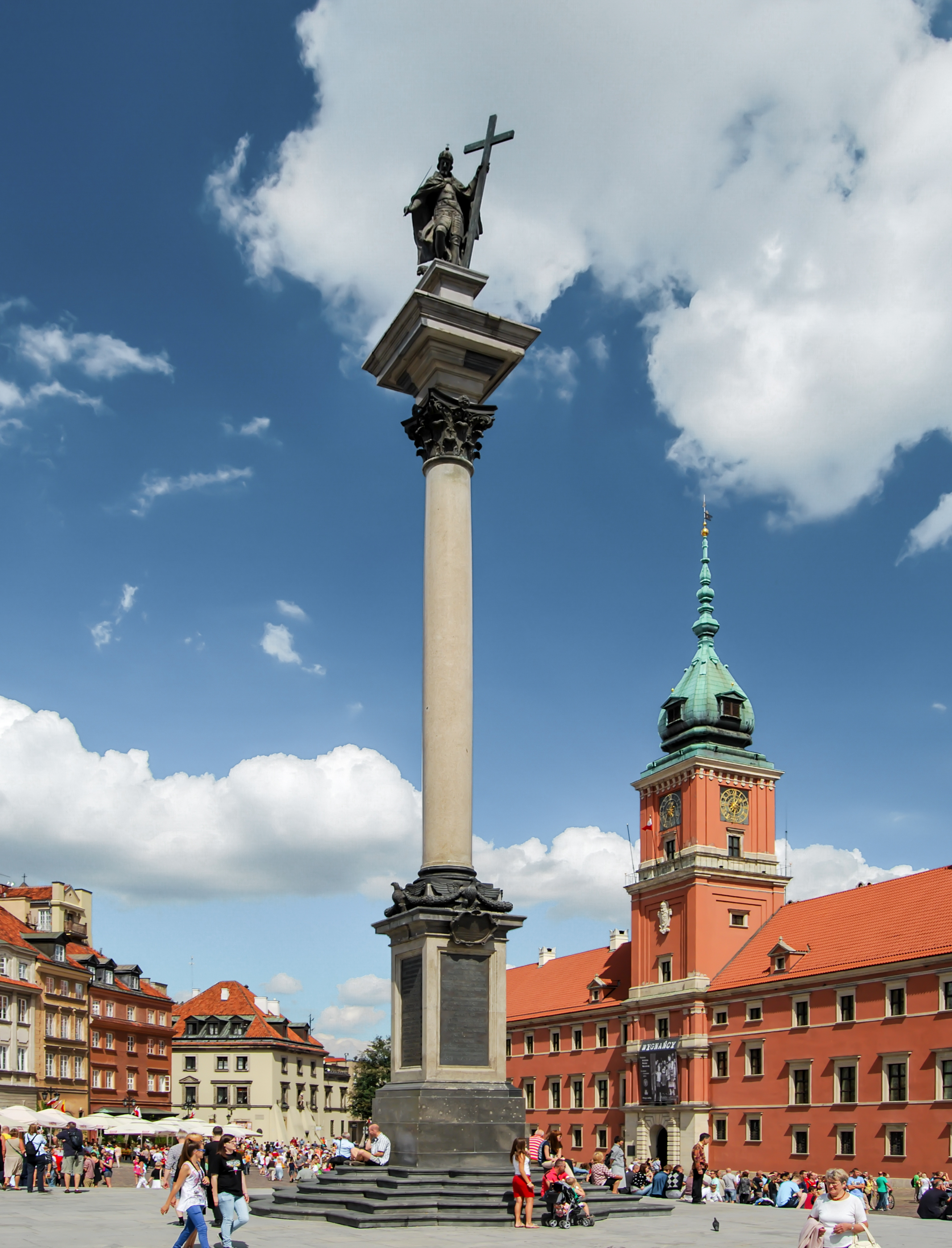
Sigismund's Column, erected by Władysław IV, 1644

Władysław had many plans (dynastic, about wars, territorial gains: regaining Silesia, Inflanty (Livonia), incorporation of Ducal Prussia, creation of his hereditary dukedom, etc.), some of them with real chances of success, but for various reasons, most of them ended in failure during his 16-year reign. Though his grand international political plans failed, he did improve the Commonwealth's foreign policy, supporting the establishment of a network of permanent diplomatic agents in important European countries.

Throughout his life, Władysław successfully defended the Commonwealth against foreign invasions. He was recognised as a good tactician and strategist, who did much to modernize the Commonwealth's Army. Władysław ensured that the officer corps was significantly large so that the army could be expanded; introduced foreign (Western) infantry to the Polish Army, with its pikes and early firearms, and supported the expansion of the artillery. His attempt to create a Polish–Lithuanian Commonwealth Navy resulted in the creation of a new port village, Władysławowo. Despite promising beginnings, Władysław failed to secure enough funds for the fleet creation; the ships were gone – sunk, or stolen – by the 1640s.

The king, while Catholic, was very tolerant and did not support the more aggressive policies of the Counter-Reformation. When he took power, the Senate of Poland had 6 Protestant members; at the time of his death, it had 11. Despite his support for religious tolerance, he did fail, however, to resolve the conflict stemming from the Union of Brest split. Despite his support for the Protestants, he did not stop the growing tide of intolerance, either in Poland or abroad, as shown by the fate of the Racovian Academy, or an international disagreement between the faiths. Neither did he get involved with the disagreement about the Orthodox Cossacks, a group that he respected and counted on in his plans.

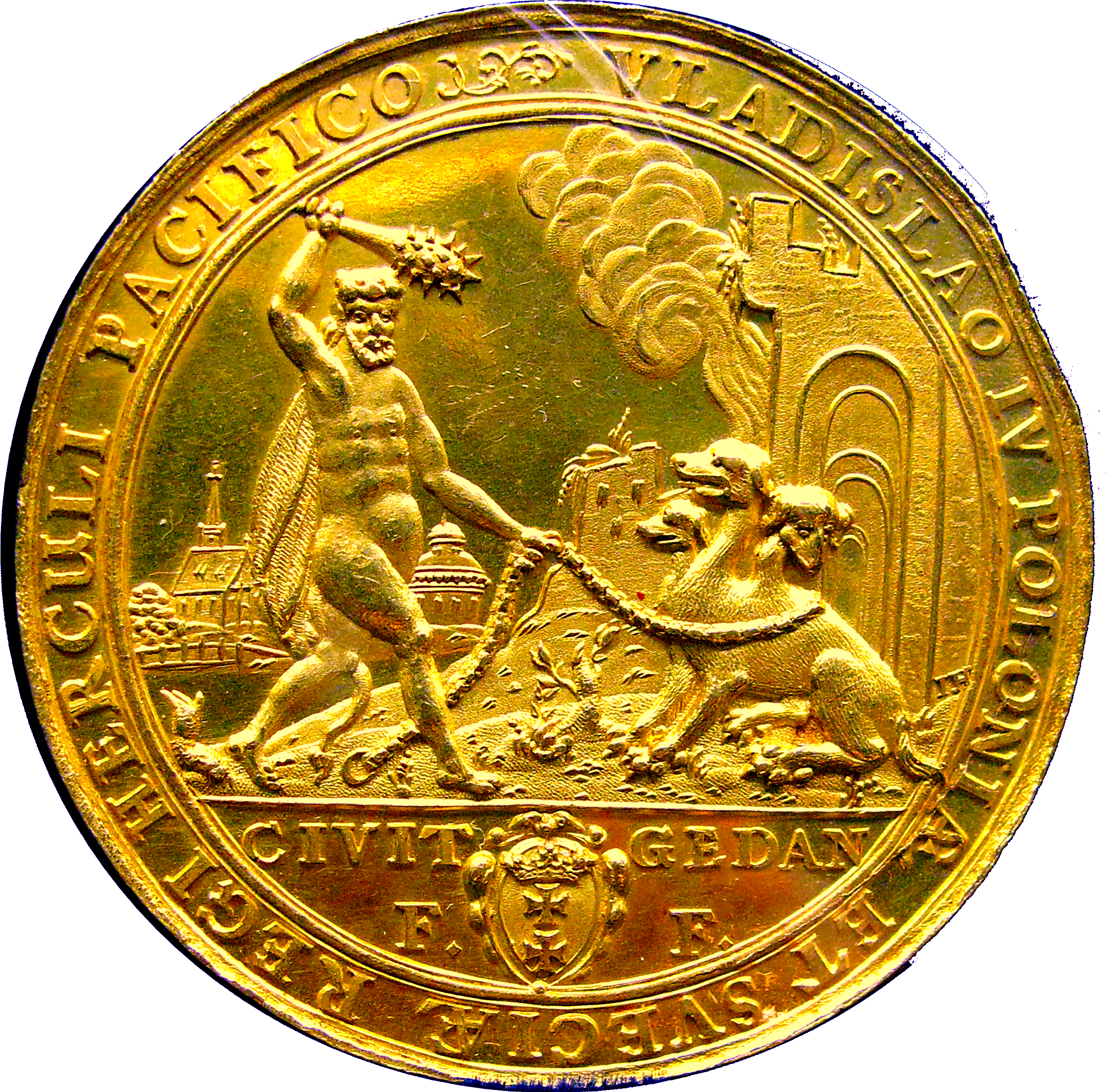
1637 medal commemorating Władysław IV's victories over Russia, Turkey and Sweden

In internal politics, he attempted to strengthen the power of the monarchy, but this was mostly thwarted by the szlachta, who valued their independence and democratic powers. Władysław suffered continuing difficulties caused by the efforts of the Commonwealth's Sejm (parliament) to check the King's power and limit his dynastic ambitions. Władysław was fed up with the weak position of the king in the Commonwealth; his politics included attempting to secure a small, preferably hereditary territory – like a duchy – where his position would be much stronger.

Władysław used the title of the King of Sweden, although he had no control over Sweden whatsoever and never set foot in that country. However, he continued his attempts to regain the Swedish throne, with a similar lack of results as his father. He might have been willing to trade his claim away, but the offer was never put down in the negotiations.

Some historians see Władysław as a dreamer who could not stick to one policy, and upon running into first difficulties, ditched it and looked for another opportunity. Perhaps it was due to this lukewarmness that Władysław was never able to inspire those he ruled to support, at least in any significant manner, any of his plans. Władysław Czapliński in his biography of the king is more understanding, noting the short period of his reign (16 years) and the weakness of the royal position he was forced to deal with.

Several years after his death, a diplomatic mission from Muscovy demanded that publications about Władysław's victories in the Smolensk War of 1633–1634 be collected and burned. Eventually, due to much controversy, their demand was met. Polish historian Maciej Rosalak noted: "under the reign of Władysław IV, such a shameful event would have never been allowed."

== Royal titles ==
- Official title:

Latin: Vladislaus Quartus, Dei Gratia Rex Poloniae, Magnus Dux Lithuaniae, Russiae, Prussiae, Masoviae, Samogitiae, Livoniae, Smolenscie, Severiae, Czernichoviaeque; nec non Suecorum, Gothorum et Vandalorumque haereditarius Rex; electus Magnus Dux Moschoviae, etc.

English translation:

Władysław IV, by the Grace of God, King of Poland, Grand Duke of Lithuania, Ruthenia, Prussia, Mazovia, Samogitia, Kiev, Volhynia, Livonia, Severia, Smolensk, Chernigov; and also hereditary King of Sweden, the Goths and the Wends; elected Grand Duke of Moscow.

In 1632, Władysław was elected King of Poland and Grand Duke of Lithuania. He claimed to be King of Sweden by paternal inheritance, but was never able to gain possession of that throne.

== See also ==
- History of Poland (1569–1795)
- History of the Polish–Lithuanian Commonwealth (1648–1764)
- Golden Liberty

== Notes ==
a After some discussions early on, he chose the title of elected Grand Duke of Moscow (electus Magnus Dux Moscoviae) rather than that of a tsar.

b Władysław had no children with his second wife, and his first wife bore him only two children (Maria Anna Izabela and Zygmunt Kazimierz), both of whom died in their youth. He had at least one known illegitimate son, Władysław Konstanty Vasa, but he played no significant role in Polish politics.

c The confusion stems from an undisambiguated use of the Polish medical term kamica in the cited reference work (Czapliński 1976). Czapliński also mentions that Władysław suffered from ill health throughout his life, related to obesity, rheumatism and kidney issues. There were months-long periods, particularly in 1635 and 1639, when he could not walk.

== Bibliography ==
- Albertrandy, Jan (1846). Dzieje krolewstwa polskiego krotko lat porzadkiem opisane przez Jana Albertrandego (in Polish). K. Jabloński. p. 164.
- Besala, Jerzy (2009). Najsłynniejsze miłości królów polskich (in Polish). Bellona Publishing House. ISBN 9788311115996.
- Bohun, Tomasz; Rosalak, Maciej (24 July 2007). "Władysław IV Waza 1595–1658". Rzeczpospolita and Mówią Wieki. Władcy Polski (in Polish). 23.
- Czapliński, Władysław (1959). Na Dworze Króla Władysława IV [At the Court of King Władysław IV] (in Polish). Warsaw: Książka i Wiedza. OCLC 577964149.
- Czapliński, Władysław (1976). Władysław IV i jego czasy [Władysław IV and His Times] (in Polish). Warsaw: Wiedza Powszechna.
- Gierowski, Józef Andrzej (1979). Historia Polski, 1505–1764 (in Polish). Państwowe Wydawnictwo Naukowe. ISBN 83-01-00172-0.
- Kamiński, Czesław; Kurpiewski, Janusz (1984). Katalog monet polskich 1632–1648 (Władysław IV) (in Polish). Warsaw: Krajowa Agencja Wydawnicza. OCLC 12805200.
- Kwiatkowski, Kajetan (1823). Dzieje narodu polskiego za panowania Władysława IV. Król Polski i Szwecki (in Polish). N. Glücksberg.
- Jasienica, Paweł (1982). Rzeczpospolita Obojga Narodów: Srebny Wiek (in Polish). Państwowy Instytut Wydawniczy. ISBN 83-06-00788-3.
- Rożek, Michał (1995). Wawel i Skałka: panteony polskie (in Polish). Ossolineum. ISBN 978-83-04-04058-8.
- Wdowiszewski, Zygmunt (2017) [2005]. Genealogia Jagiellonów i Domu Wazów w Polsce. Kraków: Wydawnictwo Avalon. ISBN 9788377302262.

Władysław IV Vasa House of Vasa Born: 9 June 1595 Died: 20 May 1648
Regnal titles
Preceded by Sigismund III Vasa	King of Poland; Grand Duke of Lithuania; 1632 – 1648	Succeeded by John II Casimir Vasa
Preceded by Vasili IV of Russia	Tsar of Russia; 1610 – 1613	Succeeded by Michael I of Russia
