= Mariensztat Market Square =

Urban square in Warsaw, Poland

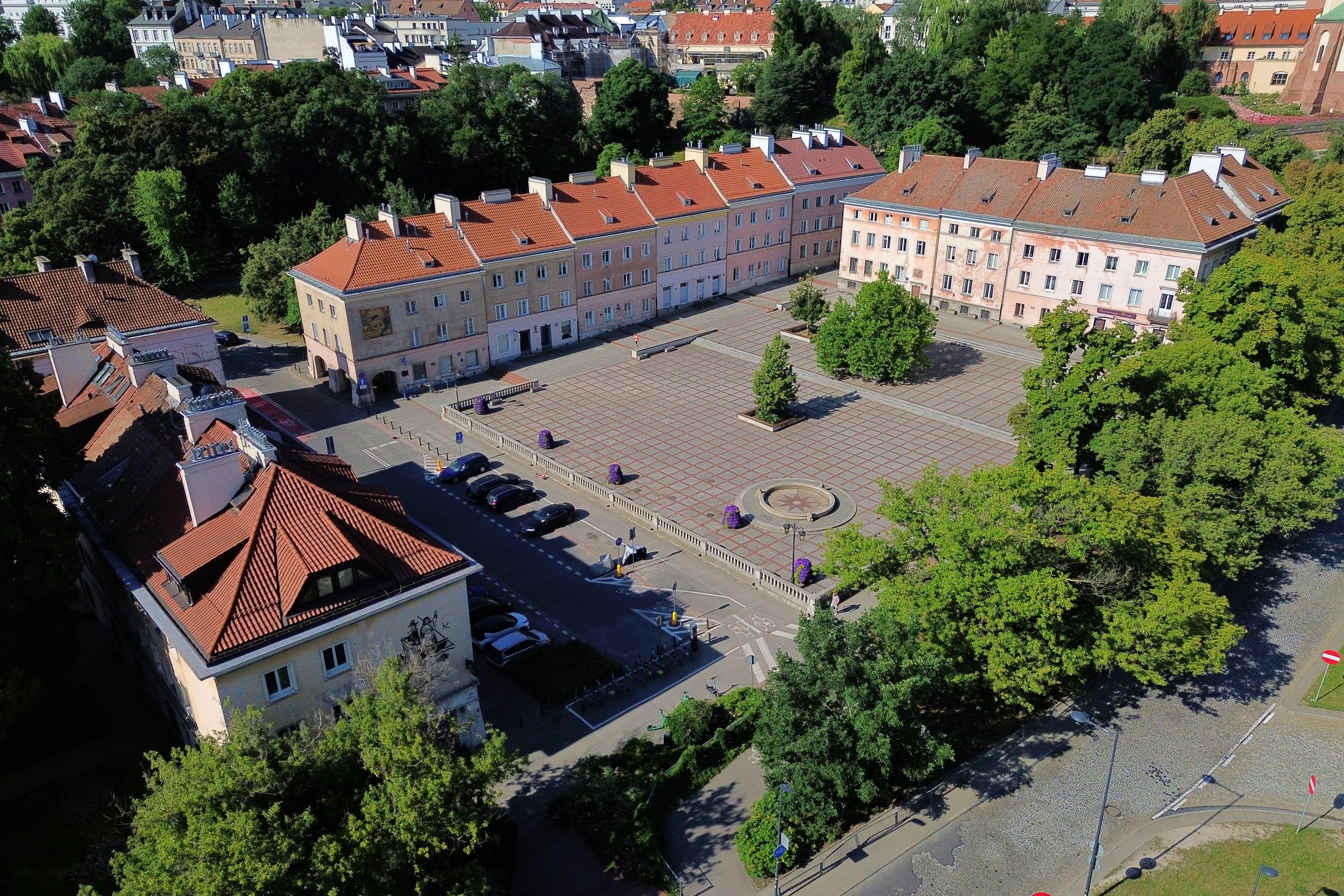
- The Mariensztat Market Square in 2024.

- Location within Warsaw
- Type: Urban square
- Location: Downtown, Warsaw, Poland
- Coordinates: 52°14′47.04″N 21°01′00.84″E
- North: Źródłowa Street
- East: Garbarska Street
- South: Mariensztat Street
- West: Krzywopoboczna Street

The Mariensztat Market Square (Polish pronunciation: [maˈrjɛn.ʂtat]; Polish: Rynek Mariensztacki) is an urban square in Warsaw, Poland. It is located in the neighbourhood of Powiśle within the Downtown district, between Mariensztat, Krzywopoboczna, Źródłowa, and Garbarska Streets. It is a central part of a small residential neighbourhood of Mariensztat. The square was originally formed in 1843, as a small marketplace, eventually becoming a major retail location around 1865. It was developed in its current form in 1949.

== History ==
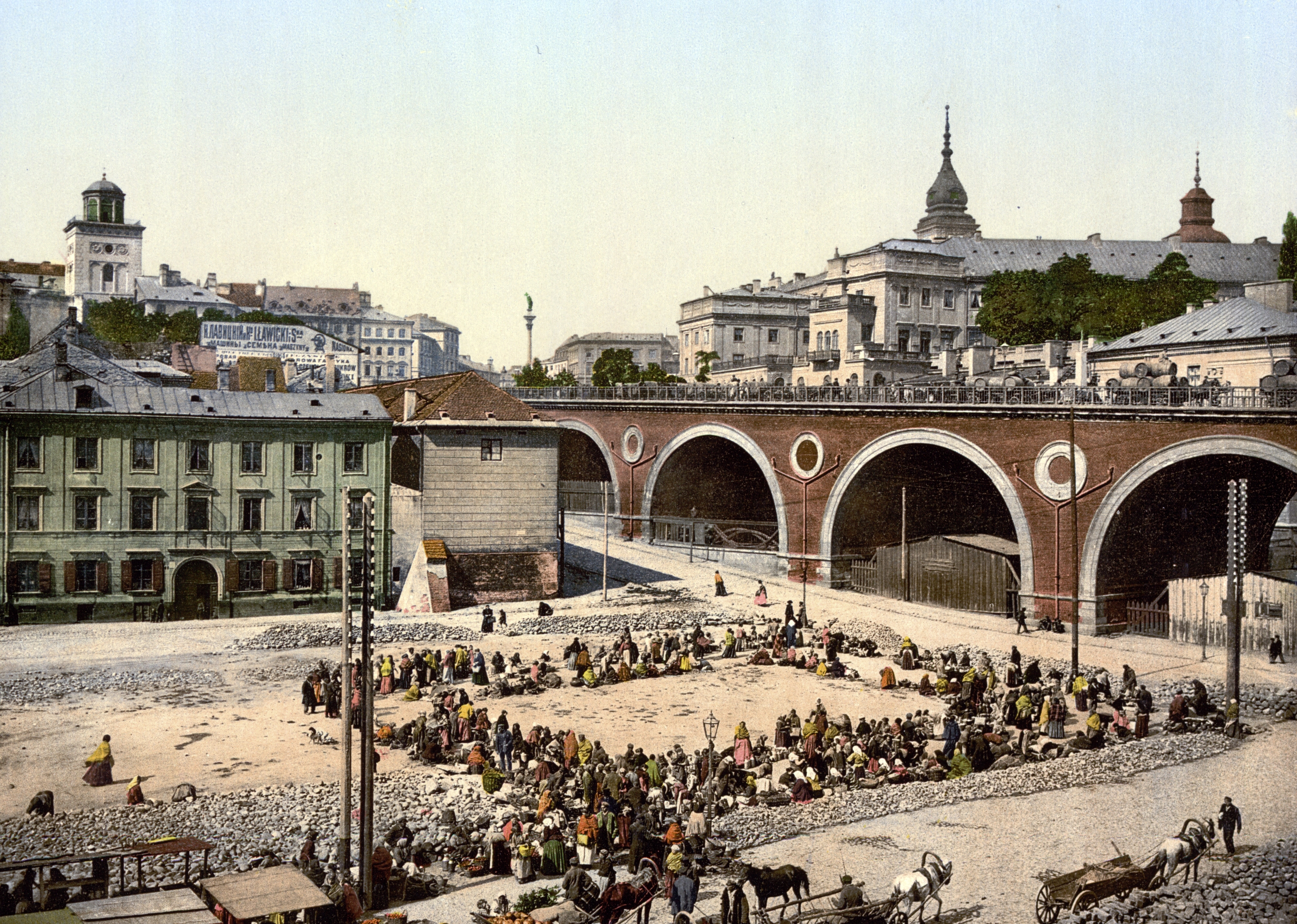
The Mariensztat Market Square and the Pancer Viaduct, sometime between 1890 and 1905.

After 1843, the Warsaw city hall bought an area in the neighbourhood of Mariensztat, forming there a small marketplace. It was expanded in the following years, for example, in 1853, when several houses at Garbarska Street were deconstructed. Around 1865, it formed an urban square, and also became the main market placed of the neighbourhood of Powiśle. It included wooden stalls with vendors offering mostly grocery products.

Between 1844 and 1846, next to it was constructed the Pancer Viaduct, which became an access road to the Kierbedź Bridge. It was destroyed by explosives in October 1944, following the end of the Warsaw Uprising.

At the beginning of the 20th century, several tenements were constructed around the marketplace. In 1913, there were relocated venders from the closed Old Town Marek Square.

The neighbourhood of Mariensztat was redeveloped in 1949, with the marketplace becoming its central point. It was surrounded on three sides with three-storey tenements. This is also when the square received its current name. On the fourth side, was opened the East–West Route, one of the major thoroughfares of the city. At the marketplace was also constructed a fountain, with small sculptures of boys looking at the water, made by Jerzy Jarnuszkiewicz.

In the 1950s, the square became a location for various city events. Among them, in 1950, there was hosted a rally titled "Hands Off Korea", protesting the Korean War.
