= Mariensztat =

- Warsaw neighborhood
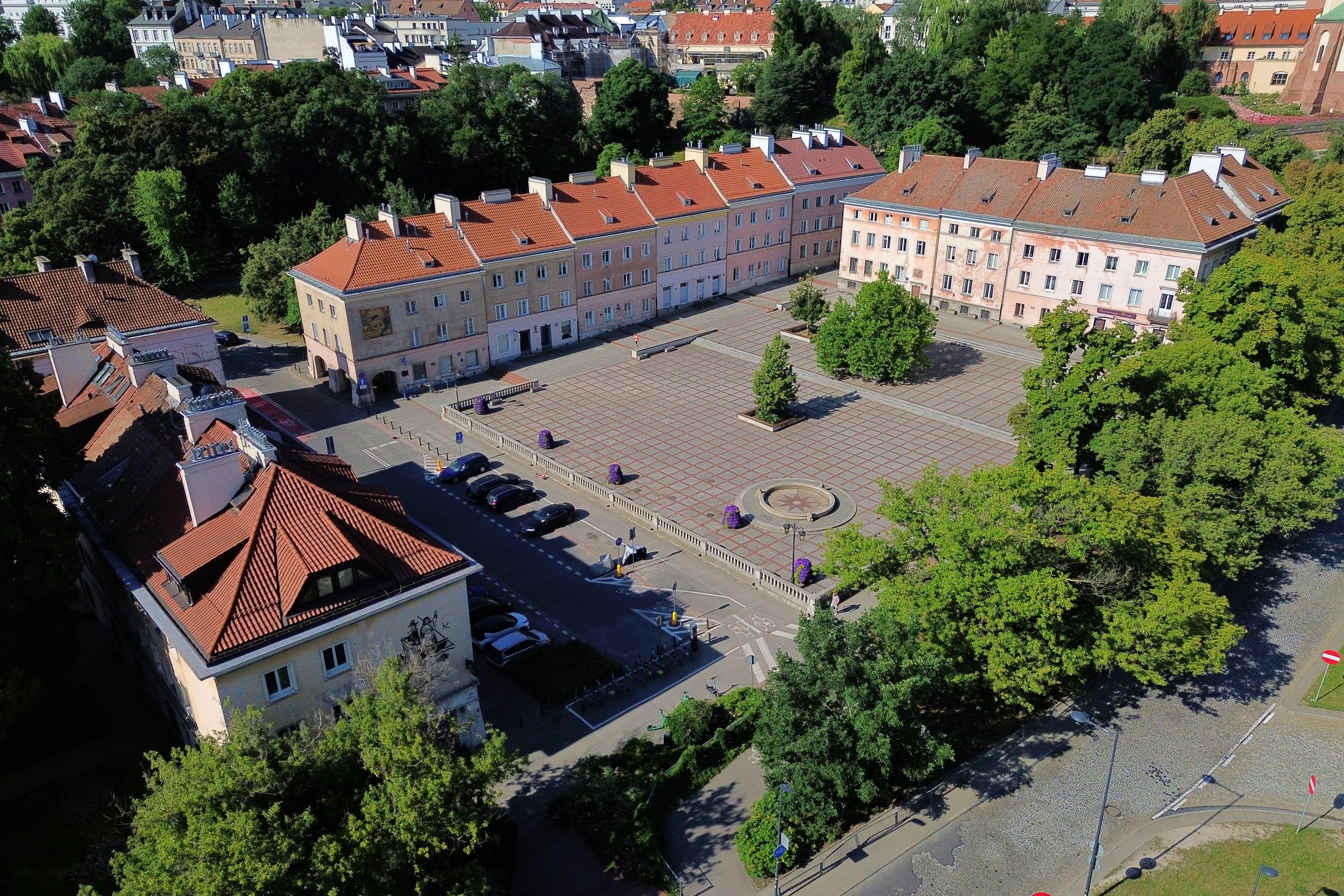
- Mariensztat Market Square
- Interactive map of Mariensztat
- Coordinates: 52.2464°N 21.0169°E
- Time zone: +2

Mariensztat (Polish pronunciation: [ˈmarjɛnʂtat]) is a historic neighbourhood along the Vistula river in central Warsaw, the capital of Poland. Situated between the riverbank and the UNESCO-protected Old Town, Mariensztat is part of the larger Śródmieście (Downtown) borough and is one of the city's smallest neighbourhoods.

== History ==
Most of contemporary Mariensztat was once beneath the water level, however, as the waters in the Vistula shifted eastward, more land on the river's western bank emerged and became available for settlement.

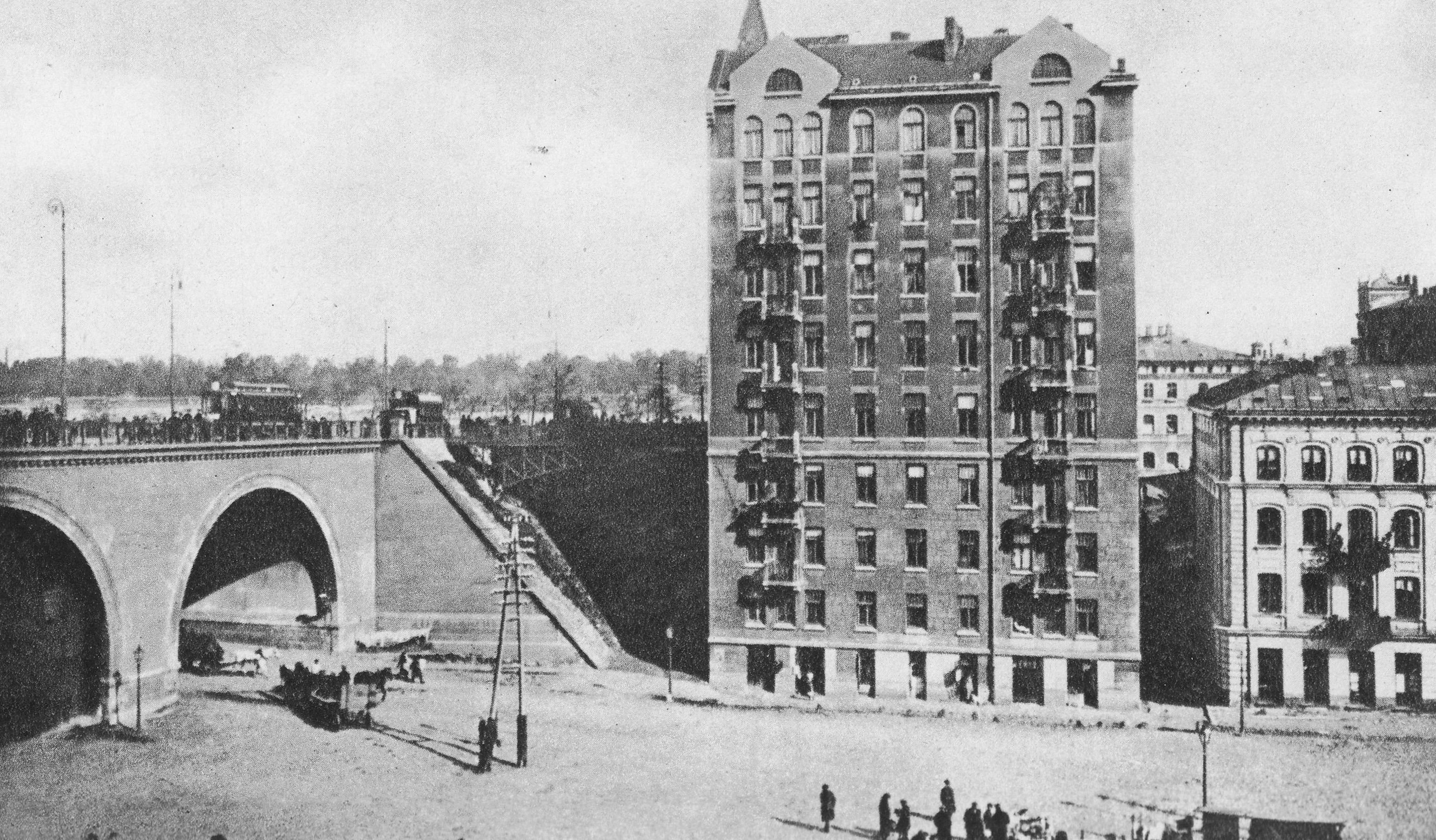
The Pancer Viaduct and Taubenhaus tenement, before 1939

The historical neighbourhood was officially established in 1762, when local nobleman Eustachy Potocki married Maria Kątska and received the parcel of land as part of Kątska's dowry. He established a jurydyka (an administrative self-governing exclave of the city) and named the settlement Maryenstadt after his wife, adding the German suffix stadt to please the Saxon king of Poland. After World War II, the spelling "Mariensztat" was adopted, though with a different pronunciation ([ˈmarjɛnʂtat]) than Marienstadt [maˈʁiːənʃtat] has in German. The town was mostly a place for trade, particularly for fresh produce that arrived by the river. The majority of the area's dwellings were wooden manors; several brick or stone tenement houses with red-terracotta roof tiles were owned by wealthier merchants. In 1784, it was incorporated into Warsaw and lost its independent town status.

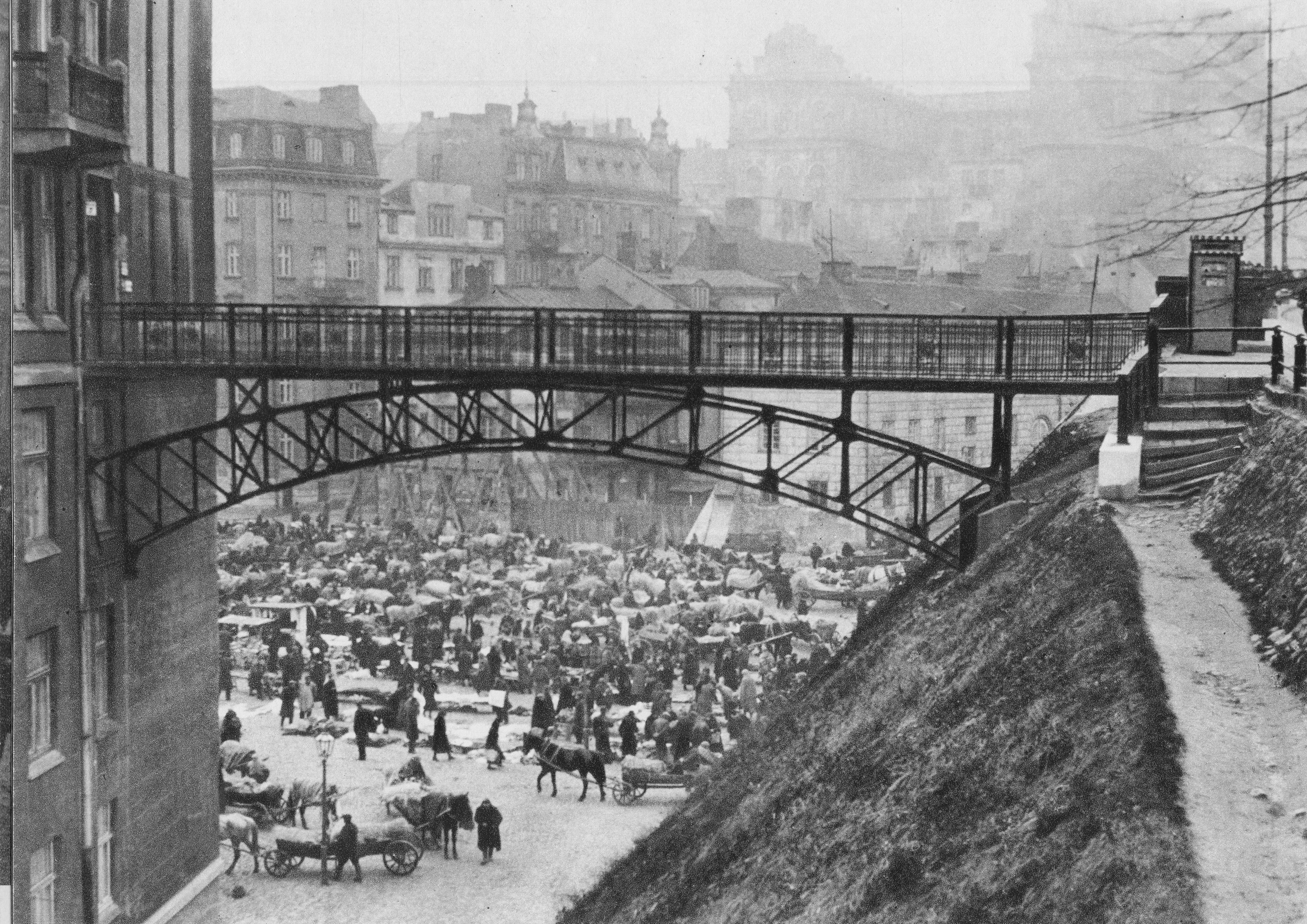
View of Mariensztat market from the Taubenhaus tenement, before 1939

With the arrival of industrialization, Mariensztat became a site of many transformations and disparities. The Pancer Viaduct, completed in 1846, connected the Royal Castle with the Kierbedź Bridge that led to the Praga borough across the river. The sudden surge of people and visitors travelling on the viaduct to Old Town increased the potential for economic activity. In the 1860s, Samuel Orgelbrand established a printing presses at Bednarska Street, one of the most modern in Congress Poland; several other factories were set up in the vicinity which attracted more settlers. By 1865, the little market square at Mariensztat was enlarged and became an important trading place along the Vistula. New townhouses were erected around the square for the more prosperous residents, including the Matias Taubenhaus tenement, the tallest in Warsaw at the time of its completion in 1911. Nevertheless, a large portion of the neighbourhood's population was poor, and the river embankment with neighbouring Powiśle and Solec remained a dilapidated and polluted slum until World War II.

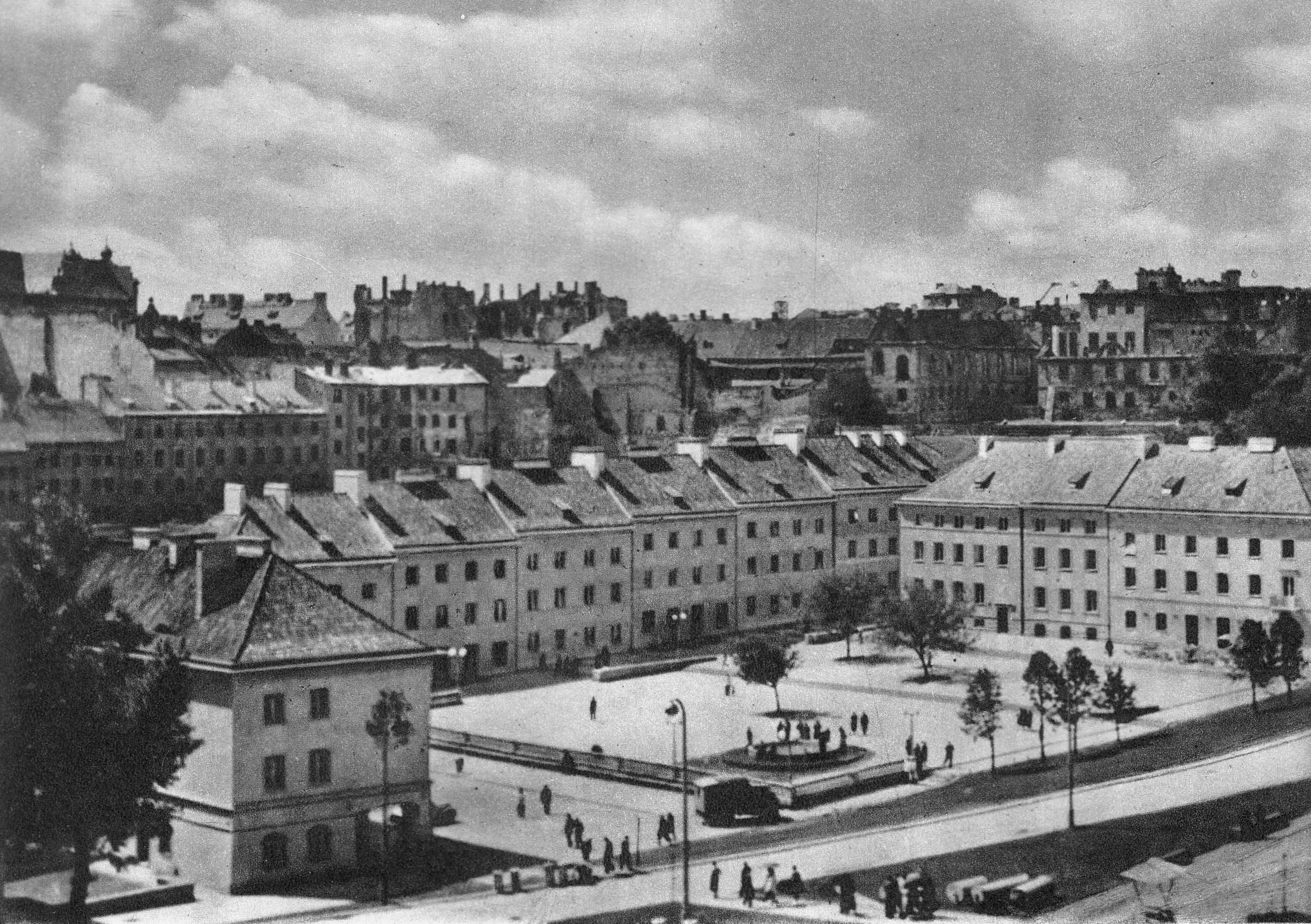
New Mariensztat after reconstruction, 1949

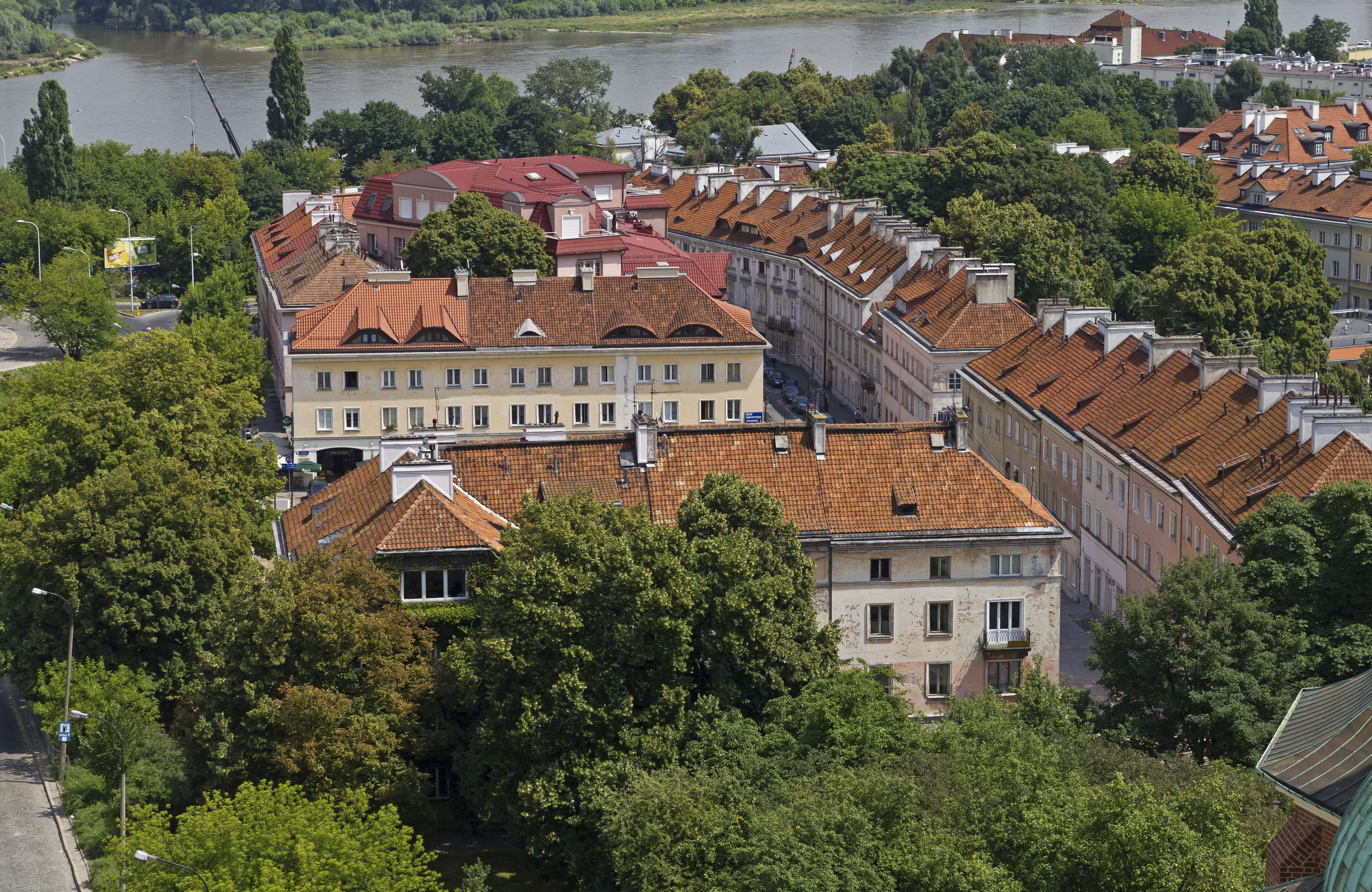
View of central Mariensztat from Saint Anne's Church

Mariensztat was razed to the ground during the Warsaw Uprising in 1944, with only a few burnt out shells of buildings remaining. Reconstruction work began in 1948, involving a complete redesign of the street plan and architectural appearance of the area into a near-Utopia. Mariensztat became a model housing project under Poland's new communist and socialist authorities, and was the first part of the city to be completed in their ongoing reconstruction of Warsaw. The historic façades of some homes were partially maintained. Architects Zygmunt Stępiński and Józef Sigalin designed the post-war buildings so as to evoke in a loose way the small-town buildings of 18th century Praga, but in the architectural style of 1940s socialist realism. The neighbourhood was featured in a 1953 propaganda film Adventure in Mariensztat.

Since then, Mariensztat has experienced little development; almost all of the housing was built between 1948 and 1949 and is surrounded by extensive parklands, which makes it a low-density, green and more tranquil area unlike the rest of Warsaw. Many of the buildings also require restoration.
