= Elżbieta Łucja Sieniawska =

Polish magnate

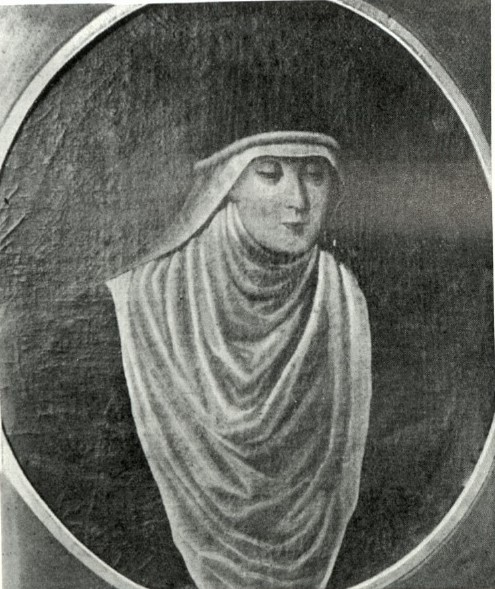
Ельжбета сенявська (2)

Elżbieta Łucja Sieniawska (1573-1624), was a Polish magnate. She was the founder of the Benedictine nunnery of Sandomierz (1614) and the Jesuit church at Lviv (1607).

She was the daughter of Anselm Gostomski and Zofia Szczawińska, and served as maid-of-honour to queen Anna Jagiellon in 1587-90 prior to her marriage to Prokop Sieniawski (d. 1596). She was famous in contemporary Poland for her ascetic lifestyle. After having become a widow, she lived for the rest of her life in extreme Catholic asceticism, following the life and principles of a monastic, going so far as to refuse medical care when she was ill, a piety of an extreme form which attracted criticism from the Catholic clergy, who thought this too much for a lay person. She also conducted persecution of the Jews on her lands.
