= Bridge Gate =

Coordinates: 52°15′07″N 21°00′43″E

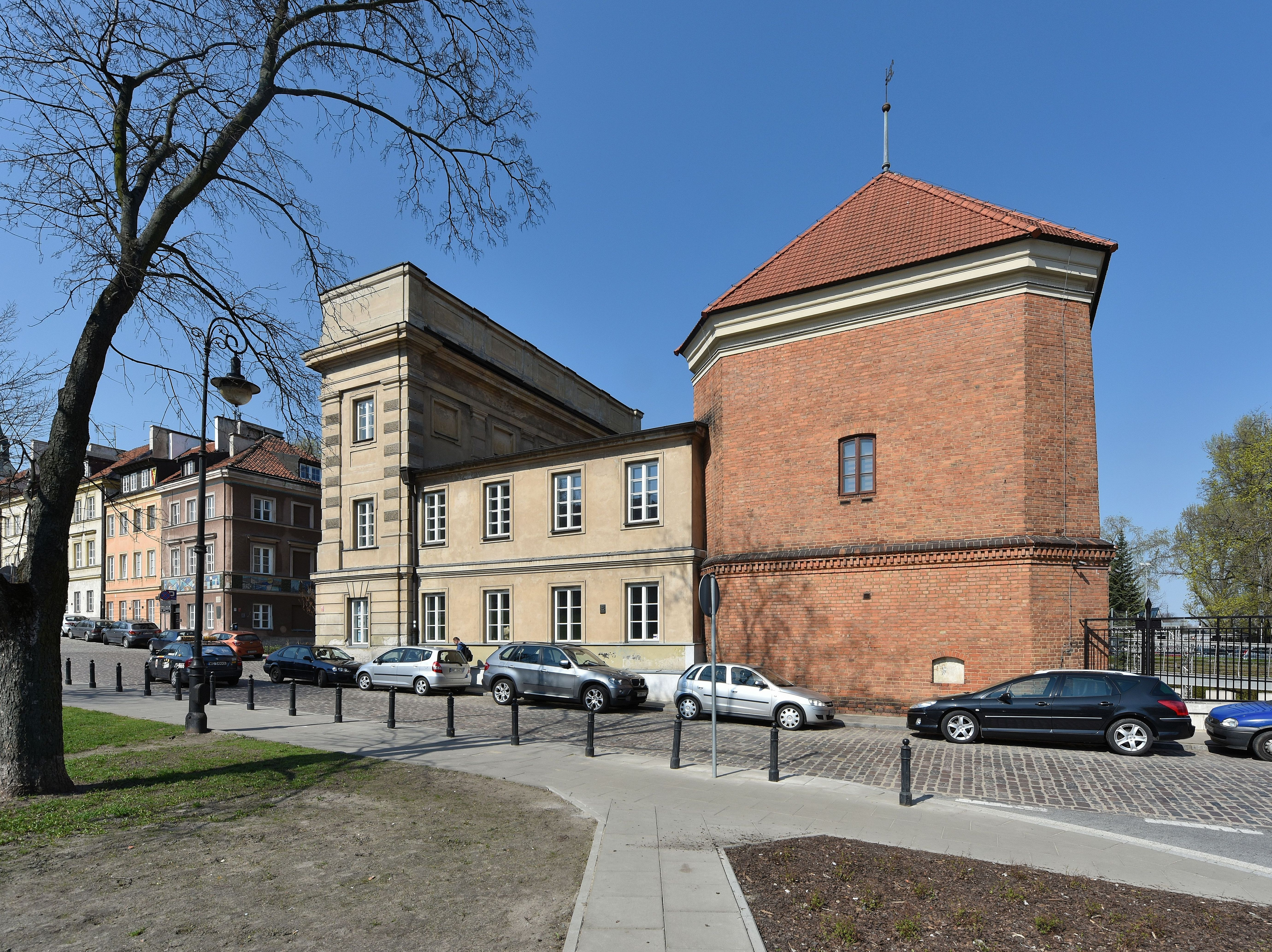
- Neoclassical façade (left) and brick gothic, renaissance original building (right).
- Interactive map of the Bridge Gate area

General information
- Architectural style: Brick Gothic, Renaissance and Neoclassical
- Location: Warsaw, Poland
- Construction started: 1582

Design and construction
- Architect: Jakub Fontana (1769)

Stara Prochownia (English: The Old Gunpowder Depot), also known as the Bridge Gate (Polish: Brama Mostowa), is a historic building in Warsaw New Town. It is located on ulica Boleść, just below the New Town and the Warsaw Barbican, on the Vistula River escarpment.

== History ==
The building was initially constructed in 1582 by Queen Anna I of Poland as one of the gates in the city walls of Warsaw. Unlike other gates, it was built to prevent fire from spreading from the densely built-up Old Town to the newly built wooden bridge that crossed the river. The gate gained the name Brama Mostowa (Bridge Gate). Although the bridge was destroyed by a flood in 1603, and subsequent bridges were built to the south, the name stuck.

In the 17th century, when the city walls lost their strategical significance in warfare, the gate was converted into a gunpowder depot, which gave its name to the contemporary name. Expanded between 1648 and 1649 it served its new role until 1769, when it was converted into a city prison. Around that time it was also expanded (possibly by Jakub Fontana) along the Boleść Street. Further expansion was done between 1796 and 1806.

Following the failed November Uprising, the Imperial Russian authorities decided to erect the Warsaw Citadel nearby; in 1833 the prison had been liquidated and the building was refurbished to become a private house. After the World War II parts of the building were rebuilt in their 18th century form.

In 1994, a plaque was unveiled on the wall of the House of Punishment and Improvement, commemorating the soldiers of the "Dzik" battalion who fought in this place in the Warsaw Uprising. Since 2002, the complex houses the educational institution of the Capital City of Warszawy – Capital Center of Cultural Education National Education Commission. The facility is called Starej Prochowni SCEK. In 2010–2012, the cellars of the building were renovated, including it in the Trail of the Cultural Cellars of the Old Town. At the same time, an amphitheater was built on the northern side of the former moat.
