= Stanisław Kierbedź =

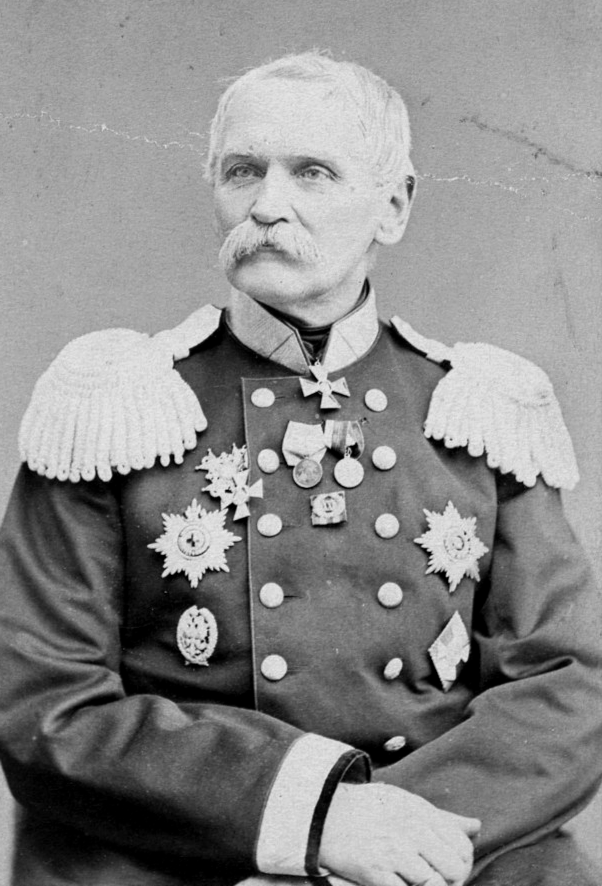
- Stanisław Kierbedź
- Born: 10 March 1810; Naudvaris, Vilnius Governorate, Russian Empire
- Died: 19 April 1899 (aged 89); Warsaw, Congress Poland, Russian Empire
- Occupation: Engineer
- Known for: Bridges, ports, railways
- Children: Eugenia Kierbedź

Stanisław Kierbedź (Russian: Станисла́в Валериа́нович Ке́рбедз, Lithuanian: Stanislovas Kerbedis 1810–1899) was a Polish railway engineer. He designed and supervised the construction of dozens of bridges, railway lines, ports and other objects in Central and Eastern Europe. He served in the Imperial Russian Army with the rank of Lieutenant General.

== Early years ==
Stanisław Kierbedź (Note: According to the dictionary of Lithuanian surnames, the etymology of surnames Kérbedis, Kerbeda, Kérbedas, Kerbedỹs, Kerbedžius, Kierbiedzius in Lithuanian language is derived from Lithuanian nouns kerbedùkas, kerbedýnas, meaning "a shrub", "a large shrub", related to Lithuanian surnames Keras, Kieras from Lithuanian verb keroti "to grow, to branch out" and are widespread in Panevėžys, Telšiai, Kelmė, Alsėdžiai, Kaltinėnai, Kruopiai, Laukuva, Varniai, Gruzdžiai and other localities in North Aukštaitija and Samogitia.) was born on 10 March 1810 into a Polish-Lithuanian landowning family (Ślepowron coat of arms) on the estate of Naudvaris near Panevėžys. He was a piarist student in Panevėžys, and in 1826 he graduated from high school in Kaunas. Then, from 1826 to 1828, he studied mathematics and physics at the Imperial University of Vilnius.

== Teaching activities ==
After graduating, he went to Saint Petersburg and in 1831 graduated from the Institute of the Corps of Engineers Communications, where he later lectured in construction and practical mechanics as an assistant professor from 1837 to 1849. From 1834 he lectured on those subjects to classes of officers of the Main School of Engineering.

From June 1837 to September 1838 he traveled with Professor Pavel Petrovich Melnikov to many European universities. He visited Germany, Austria, Switzerland, France (including in Paris at the Ecole des Ponts et Chaussees), England (with classes at the British Association for the Advancement of Science in Newcastle upon Tyne), Belgium and the Netherlands.

After his return he continued his activities as a lecturer at the Institute of Mining, the Warsaw School of Engineers in the Field, and in the School of the Marine Corps. From 1841 to 1843 he taught general mechanics at the University of St. Petersburg.

As a result, he had more and more involvement in the practical use of this knowledge, and mainly stopped teaching in 1849.

== Practical activities ==
Under his leadership, work on the St. Stanislaus's Catholic Church in St. Petersburg was performed. Kierbedź also worked at the time as an assistant to Professor Melnikov, who was Director of Railways.

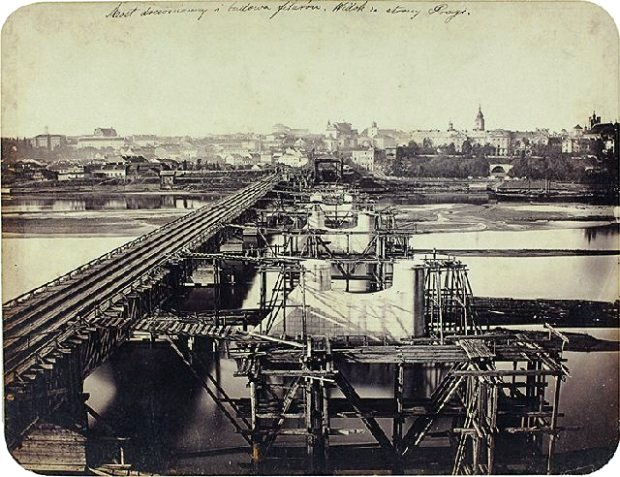
The construction of the Kierbedź Bridge in Warsaw in 1862

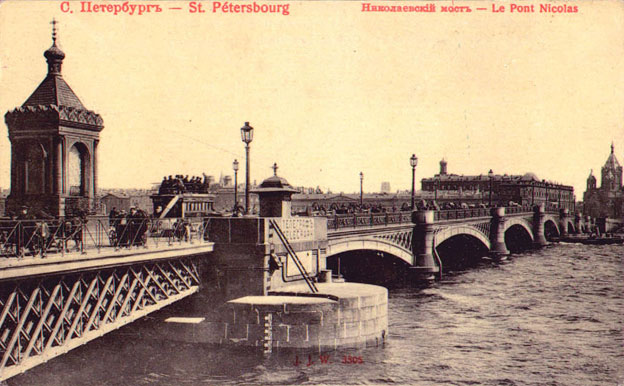
The cast iron bridge over the Neva river in 1900

In 1842 he came up with the idea to build an iron bridge over the Neva River. The project was risky because of the construction conditions: a 12 meter deep river, with a strong current, ice floes in the winter, tidal waters, as well as the need to keep the river available for ships. Experts doubted at the time whether it is possible to build any bridge over the capricious river. The decision to entrust its construction to Kierbedź was taken by Tsar Nicholas I directly. Construction took 8 years and St. Petersburg gained a bridge 342 meters long, 20 meters wide, made of cast-iron with seven fixed spans and one drawbridge. It was named the Blagoveshchensky Bridge (later renamed Nikolaevsky Bridge after Tsar Nicolas's death). On the opening day of the bridge, on 6 (18) November 1850, Kierbedź was awarded a specially stamped medal and promoted General-Mayor (Major-General).

In 1852 he became deputy chief of construction of the Saint Petersburg–Warsaw Railway and went abroad in order to familiarize himself with new technologies and ways of building iron bridges, to help build the new railway. He visited England, Germany, Austria and Belgium. He soon made use of this knowledge, building his first truss bridge with a span length of 55 meters over the Luga River from 1853 to 1857.

Kierbedź was chief of construction in 1856-57 of the St. Petersburg-Peterhof Railway, which was opened for service on 15 (21) July 1857. He was awarded the Order of St. Stanislav, 1st Class, in 1855 and the order of the Red Eagle, 2nd Class, in December 1857.

From 1858 Kierbedź was a member of the Head Council of Railways and Public Buildings Direction. On 17 (29) December 1858 he was made an honorary member of the Imperial St. Petersburg Academy of Sciences.

In 1859 he started the construction of a permanent iron bridge (the first) over the Vistula River in Warsaw. Stanislaw Kierbedź was deputy head of technical matters on the Bridge Construction Board along with General-Adjutant Count Paul Demetrius Kotzebue. The bridge was completed in 1864 and officially given the name "Alexander Bridge" (after the reigning Tsar), but was commonly known as the Kierbedzia Bridge. Caissons were used to build the pillars for the bridge which was an unusual construction technique at the time. In recognition of his achievement, he was decorated with the Order of St. Vladimir, 2nd Class, on 18 (30) December 1864.

== Senior engineer ==
Kierbedź was promoted General-Leytenant (Lieutenant-General) in 1868 and given the civil rank of Privy Councillor (equivalent to German Geheimrat). In 1872 he was chief engineer of port construction in Kronstadt, including the ship channel to St. Petersburg.

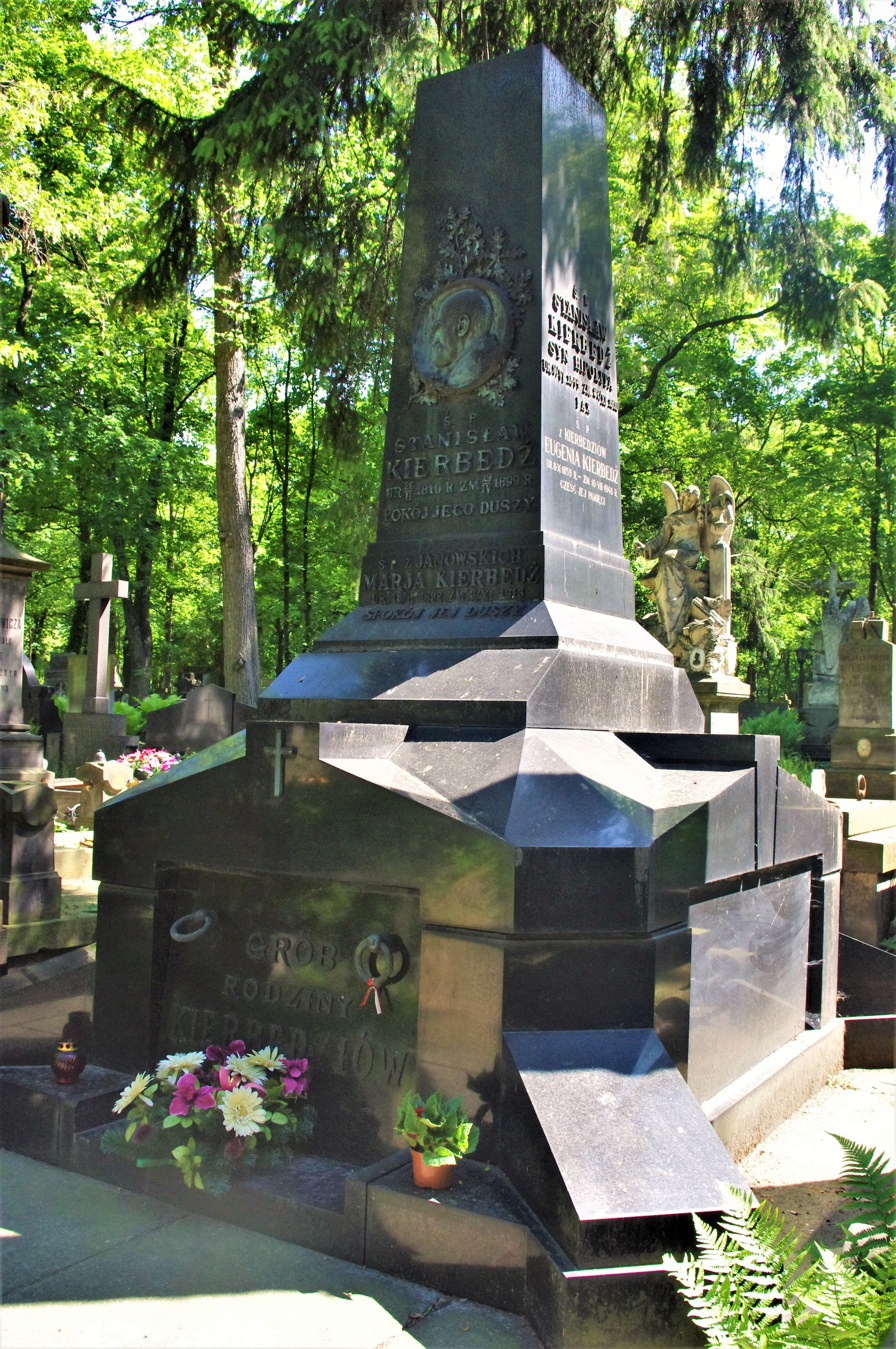
The tomb of Stanisław Kierbedź, daughter Eugenia and son-in-law Stanislaw in Powązki Cemetery, Warsaw

In 1881 he was appointed to the civil rank of Active Privy Councillor. He was named chairman of the Administration Department of the Ministry of Transport in July 1884, and his civil rank allowed him to substitute repeatedly as Minister of Transport (from 1886 to 1887) during the absences of Konstantin Posyet from the capital. In October 1887 he was transferred to the chairmanship of the Technical Department of the Ministry of Transport.

After many years of work, in 1889 he was decorated with the Order of St. Vladimir, 1st Class, and awarded honorary memberships in:

- The Institute of Communications Engineers in St. Petersburg, which also funded three scholarships in his name
- The Communication Engineers Association, which established the prize named after him, awarded every three years for the best technical articles

A scholarship in his name was also funded by the Warsaw University of Technology.

He retired due to ill health on 28 July (9 August) 1891. Kierbedź settled permanently in Warsaw, where he died on 7 (19) April 1899. He is buried in the Powązki Cemetery.

== Family ==
Stanisław Kierbedź was married twice. He and his first wife, Paulina Montrymowicz (17 [29] June 1827 - 21 April [3 May] 1847, St. Petersburg), were the parents of a daughter, Paulina (7 [19] April 1847 - 9 [21] May 1889, St. Petersburg).

Kierbedź and his second wife, Maria Janowskis (3 [15] February 1832 - 21 October [3 November] 1915, Warsaw) were the parents of six children:

- Mikołaj (Russian: Nikolai; 1852–1872)
- Michał-Wincenty (Mikhail; 10 [22] August 1854, St. Petersburg - 4 October 1932, Warsaw)
- Walerian (Valerian; 4 [16] September 1856 - 28 December 1857 [9 January 1858], St. Petersburg
- Eugenia (26 September [8 October] 1859, St. Petersburg - 10 July 1946, Rome)
- Stanisław (Stanislav; 11 [23] April 1866 - 12 [24] May 1867)
- Zofia (Sofiy; 30 June [12 July] 1871, St. Petersburg - 8 August 1963, Semigallia, Italy); married Liubomiras Dimsa (28 December 1858 [19 January 1859, Tesiai, Lithuania - 18 November [1 December] 1915, St. Petersburg

In 1876 Eugenia married her first cousin, Stanisław (Russian: Stanislav Ippolitovich Kerbedz; 28 May [9 June] 1844, St. Petersburg - 14 [27] November 1910, St. Petersburg), the son of her father's younger brother Hippolit (3 [15 August 1817 - 19 June [1 July] 1858). Eugenia and Stanisław were the parents of a daughter, Felicia Ella (Russian: Felitsy; 1888–1963); married first (circa 1900) Waldemar Tyszkiewicz (1877, Kraków - 1934) and second (1940) Adam Romer (5 January 1892, Neutitschen, Austria-Hungary [now Nový Jičín, Czech Republic] - 1965); no issue.

Eugenia's husband was a member of the Engineering Council of the Russian Ministry of Transport and the chief of construction of the Tikhoretsk<--ru:Тихорецкая for the railway station-->-Novorossisk branch of the Vladikavkaz Railway (1885–88) and of the Kavkazky-Stavropol Railway (1893–97). Stanislaw twice served as president of the Chinese Eastern Railway (17 December 1896 - January 1897 and 28 July 1900 - 1 July 1903) during its construction.

After her husband's death, Eugenia lived in Rome. She was a prominent Polish philanthropist, her most visible benefactions being the Warsaw Public Library and the School of Fine Arts in Warsaw, both completed in 1914, and a hospital pavilion for the mentally ill in the country near Warsaw, completed in 1915. She was decorated with the Knight's Cross of the Order of Polonia Restituta on 2 May 1923 and named an honorary citizen of Warsaw in 1929. Upon her death she was temporarily interred in Rome, but in 1978 she was reinterred beside her husband and father in Powązki Cemetery, Warsaw.

== Sources ==
- "Кербедз, Станислав Валерианович" . Brockhaus and Efron Encyclopedic Dictionary (in Russian). 1906.
