= Martin Kober =

German painter (c. 1550 – before 1598)

- Born: c. 1550; Wrocław
- Died: before 1598; Kraków or Warsaw
- Known for: Portrait painting
- Movement: Mannerism
- Patrons: Stephen Báthory, Rudolf II, Holy Roman Emperor, Anna Jagiellon, Sigismund III Vasa

Martin Kober (also Chober, Cober, Coeber, Khober, Koeber, Koebner; Polish: Marcin Kober; c. 1550 – before 1598) was a portrait painter and court painter to different Central European monarchs, including Stephen Báthory, Rudolf II, Anna Jagiellon and Sigismund III Vasa. He was active mainly in the Polish–Lithuanian Commonwealth.

== Life ==
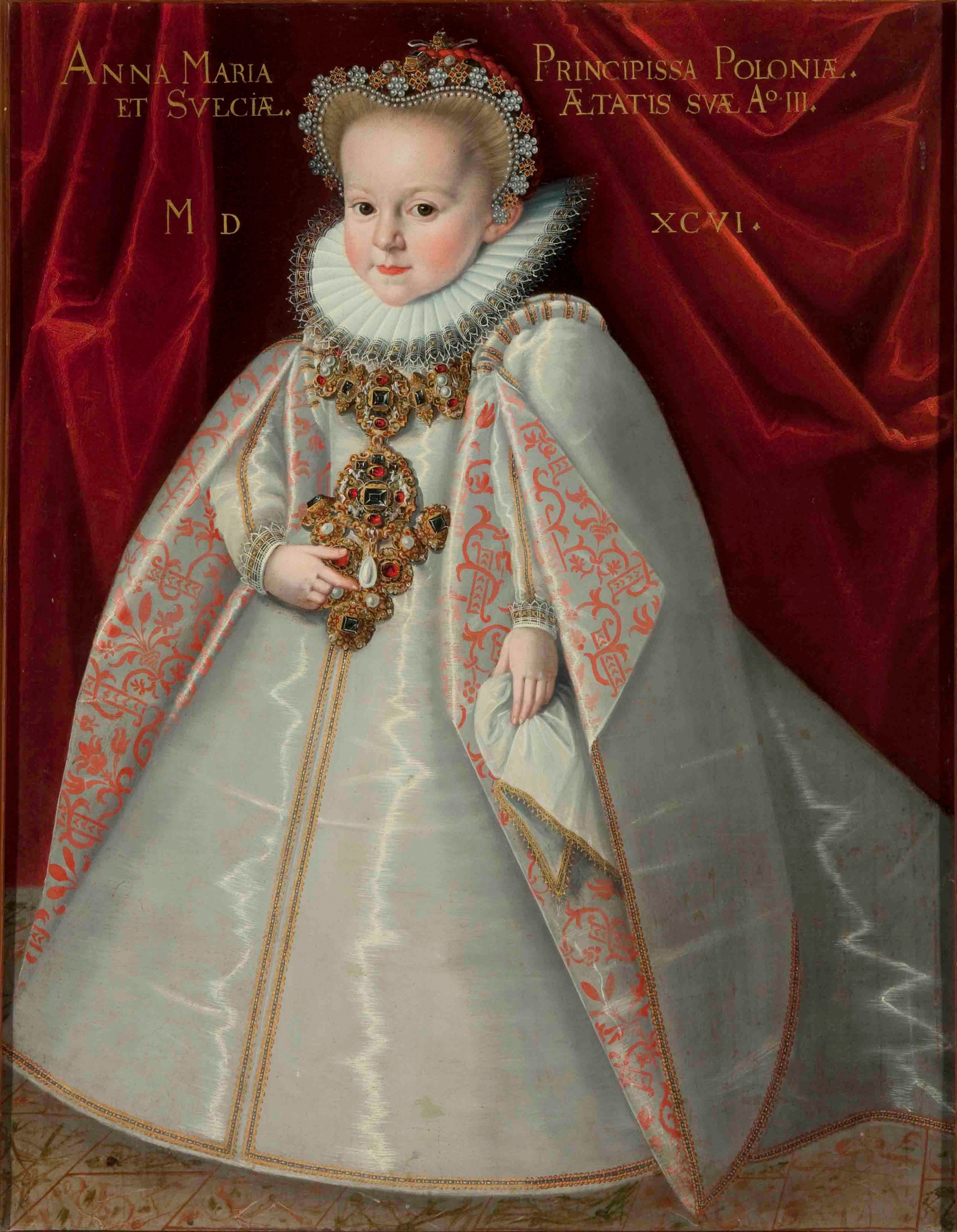
Portrait of Crown Princess Anna Maria Vasa, 1596

Marcin Kober, of Polish descent, was born in Wrocław, Poland. Trained as a guild painter, he traveled through Germany for three years as a wandering journeyman to gain experience in different workshops. In 1583 he came to the Polish–Lithuanian Commonwealth from Magdeburg and become court painter of King Stephen Báthory and Queen Anna Jagiellon. He was appointed the royal servitor and at the court he met his wife Dorothea, also a painter specializing in painting crests. After the King's death he returned to Wrocław, from where he joined the Imperial court of Rudolf II in Prague as a portrait painter, due to the conflict with other guild painters in the city. The emperor released him from the guild laws in 1587. After his return to Poland in 1590 he was employed by King Sigismund III Vasa and worked in Kraków and Warsaw. He also traveled to Graz in 1595 to paint portraits of the family of Archduke Charles II for Queen Anne of Austria. Kober died in Kraków or Warsaw.

== Work ==
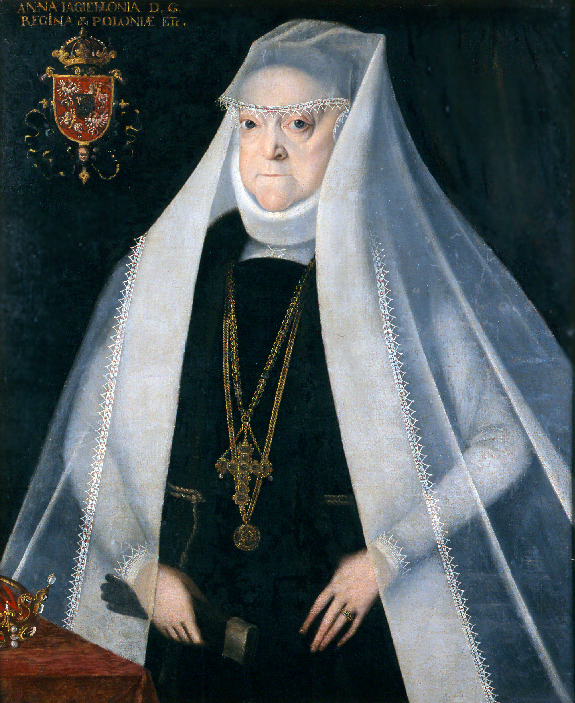
Portrait of Queen Anna of Poland - ca. 1590

Until the times of Martin Kober the portraiture in Poland was treated as not very important branch of painting by local artists. Kober was the first painter active in the Commonwealth specializing in the official portraiture and is therefore considered as the precursor of this genre in Poland. His portraits of the royal family influenced the royal iconography for the next hundred years and found its source in Spanish portraiture through artistic community in Prague. His earlier works at the court of Stephen Báthory affected development of the Polish Sarmatian portrait.

The artist works can be found in different museums across Europe including Orava Gallery in Dolný Kubín (Portrait of Daniel Kubínyiho), Uffizi in Florence (Portrait of Stephen Báthory), Convent of Las Descalzas Reales in Madrid (portraits of royal children), Bavarian State Picture Collection (portraits of royal children), Kunsthistorisches Museum in Vienna (Portrait of Sigismund III Vasa) and in Poland with several versions of portrait of widowed Anna Jagiellon, presumably an evidence of well organized workshop. The effigy, with Wawel Castle version considered as original, was painted flat. It is characterized by a strong realism and decorativeness. Versions in the National Museum in Warsaw and in the Museum of King Jan III's Palace at Wilanów differ is details with absence or addition of certain parts.
