= Sigismund Augustus Bridge =

Former bridge in Warsaw

Sigismund Augustus Bridge Most Zygmunta Augusta
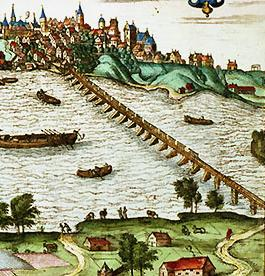
- Coordinates: 52°15′11″N 21°0′58″E
- Carried: Road transport
- Crossed: Vistula River
- Locale: Warsaw

Characteristics
- Total length: 500 m
- Width: 6 m

History
- Architect: Erazm Giotto
- Construction start: 1568
- Construction end: 1573
- Collapsed: 1603

Location
- Interactive map of Sigismund Augustus Bridge

The Sigismund Augustus Bridge (Polish: Most Zygmunta Augusta) was a timber bridge over the Vistula River in Warsaw which came into operation in 1573 and lasted for 30 years. It was the first permanent crossing over the Vistula River in Warsaw and the longest wooden crossing in Europe at the time, at 500 meters in length. The bridge was one of the greatest engineering works of the Renaissance in Poland and on the continent.

== History ==
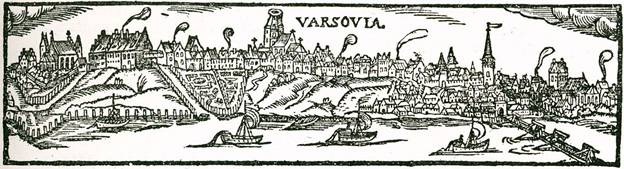
The oldest view of Warsaw from approximately 1573 with a view of the bridge on the right

"Sigismund Augustus built a wooden bridge over the Vistula River, 1150 feet long, that as the length and magnificence of the view in the whole of Europe had almost unparalleled, and elicited universal admiration ..." Georg Braun (1530-1584) German traveler

Before a permanent bridge was built over the Vistula, crossing were made by ferries and boats. During elections, temporary bridges were also constructed.

Construction began in 1568 under King Sigismund II Augustus in connection with the development of Warsaw, as the king frequently stayed there leading an active policy in the north-eastern part of the Republic. Warsaw was important because of regular parliamentary conventions of the Crown of the Kingdom of Poland and the Grand Duchy of Lithuania for the expected union.

Construction was led by the Italian Erazm Giotto of Zakroczym, with supervision from the Czersk Castellan and the Mayor of Warsaw, Zygmunt Wolski. Father Kasper Sadłocha, the Canon of Warsaw and royal secretary, was responsible for financial matters. Construction cost 100,000 florins. The first pile was dug on 25 June 1568, and during the construction these oak piles were hammered into the bottom of the river using iron pile drivers installed on floating river rafts. Before his death in 1572, King Sigismund Augustus crossed the unfinished bridge. After his death, the construction was taken up by his sister Queen Anna Jagiellon, largely at her own expense which led to the completion of the bridge in 1573.

The bridge was guarded by a specially appointed militia. Initially, the passage was free, but later fees were collected to cross it. On the Praga side of the bridge, from 1569 to 1572, a wooden mansion was built for King Sigismund Augustus. It was erected on a stone foundation and had three main rooms: a large heated dining hall, a chamber with a cocklestove, and a bedroom with an entrance to the basement. It was surrounded by a garden and a palisade and was used by the king to rest.

In 1582 the Bridge Gate was added, separating the bridge from the wooden buildings of the city (mainly for fire protection). On the Praga side of the river there were similar gates near to today's Ratuszowa Street.

In 1595, the bridge was mentioned by visiting Cardinal Gaetano 's secretary Paulo Mucante. He recorded this in Latin:

""Ne pontem sublicium superbo sumptu, atqe arte admirabili, a Sigmundo Augusto Rege fratre inchoatum, et a se post ejus mortem, consimili opere perfectum, repens vicina Suburbanorum male cantorum tectorum flamma, nec opina temore unquam corriperet correptumque in favillam redigeret. Anna Jagellona Poloniae Regum, conjux, Soror, Filia, hoc Caterilli propugnaculi Sepimento lutissimo a fundamentis excitato muniendum curavit." Paul Mucante 1595

Where he mentions that the bridge was started by the King and finished by his sister but is running a risk of fire by being made of wood.

The bridge served residents of Warsaw and visitors to it for 30 years. During its operation, the biggest threat to it was the winter and the thaws. The bridge was partially damaged several times by the pressure of ice on the Vistula River. It was repaired several times during the reign of King Stephen Báthory but eventually collapsed under the onslaught of a spring ice floe in 1603.

Mostowa Street (Bridge Street), which led to it, still remains in Warsaw today. It wasn't until 1864 when another permanent bridge was built over the Vistula in Warsaw.

== Design and construction of the bridge ==
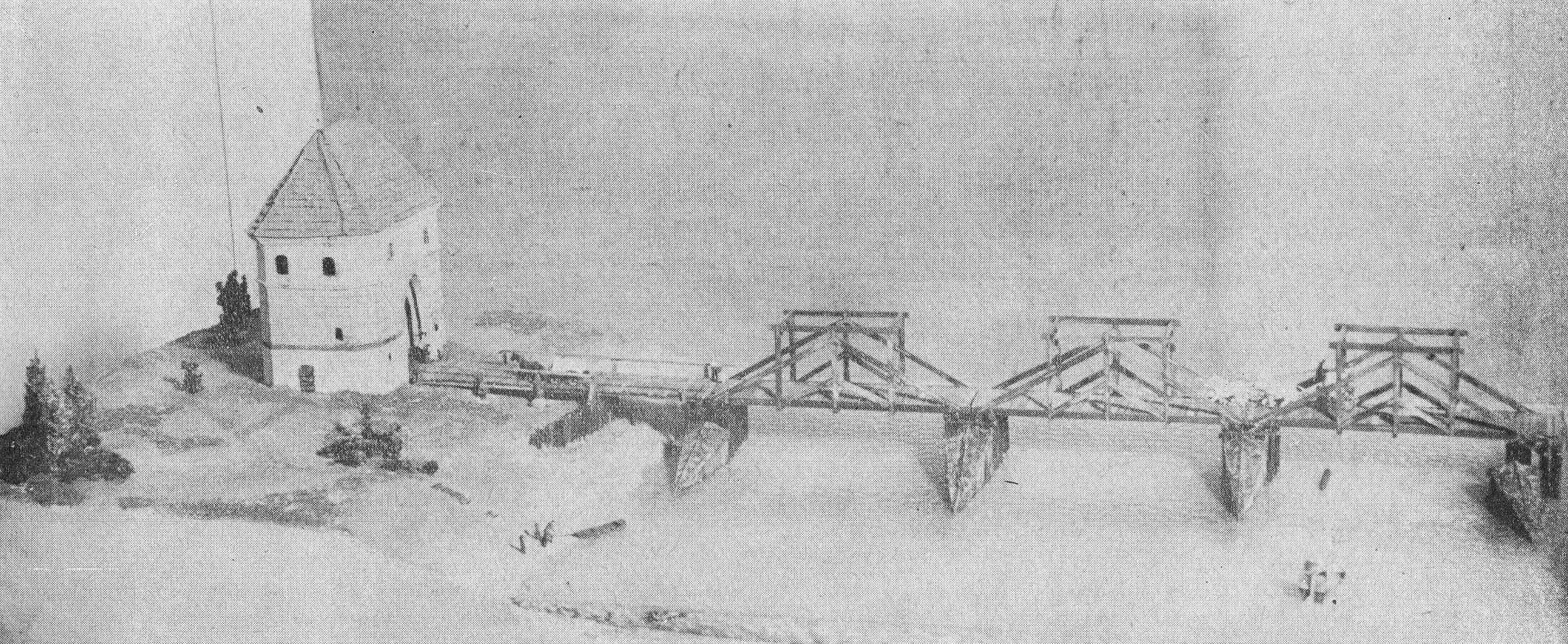
A 1960s scale model of the crossing and the brick Bridge Gate

The bridge uses a truss bearing system, which accounted for its technical novelty. It was made of oak wood and iron. It consisted of 22 spans with spans from 22 to 24 m long. It had 18 major fixed spans erected on piles and it was 500 m long and 6 m wide. For its construction 735 chariots of Hungarian iron rails were used. The middle part was able to be opened to allow ships on the Vistula to pass.

== Commemoration ==
The bridge was commemorated by poet Jan Kochanowski, who wrote about it in a few epigrams. In one of them bearing the title On a bridge in Warsaw the author would like to thank the king for the construction of this bridge because he did not have to pay for ferry crossings across the Vistula:

Bógżeć zapłać, o królu, żeś ten most zbudował.
Pierwej zawżdy szeląg nad potrzebę chował,
A dziś i tenem przepił, bo, idąc do domu
Najpóźniej, od przewozu nie płacę nikomu
- Jan Kochanowski (1530-1584)

== Bibliography ==
- Michał Pilch, Warszawska Praga. Przewodnik, Fundacja Centrum Europy, Warszawa 2005, ISBN 83-923305-7-9
