= Pancer Viaduct =

Pancer Viaduct Wiadukt Pancera w Warszawie
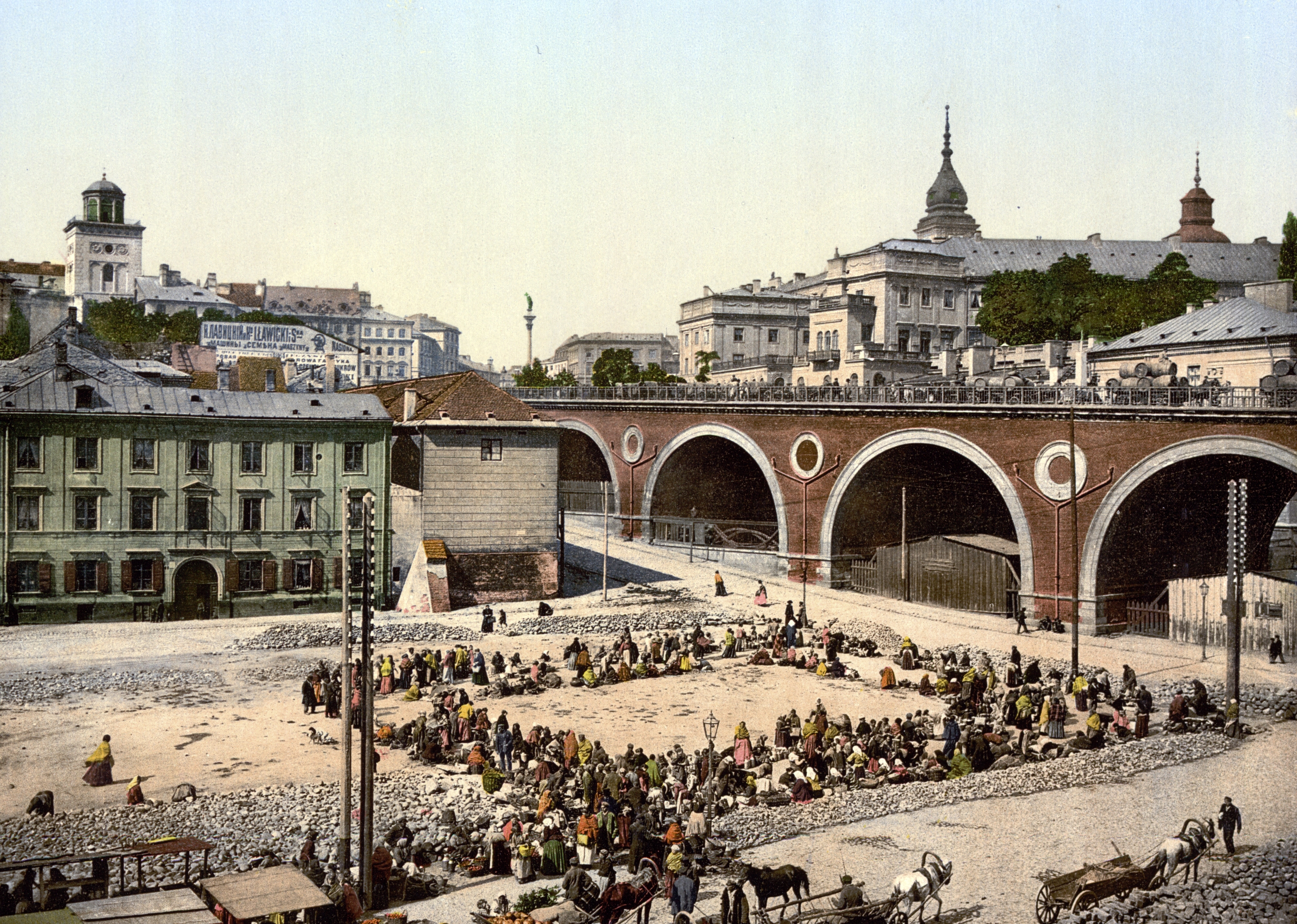
- The Pancer Viaduct and the Mariensztat market (1890 to 1905)
- Coordinates: 52°14′49.02″N 21°0′53.71″E

Characteristics
- Total length: 657 m
- Width: 20.7 m
- Longest span: 14.9 m
- No. of spans: 7

History
- Architect: Feliks Pancer
- Construction start: 1844
- Construction end: 1846
- Collapsed: 1944

Location
- Interactive map of Pancer Viaduct

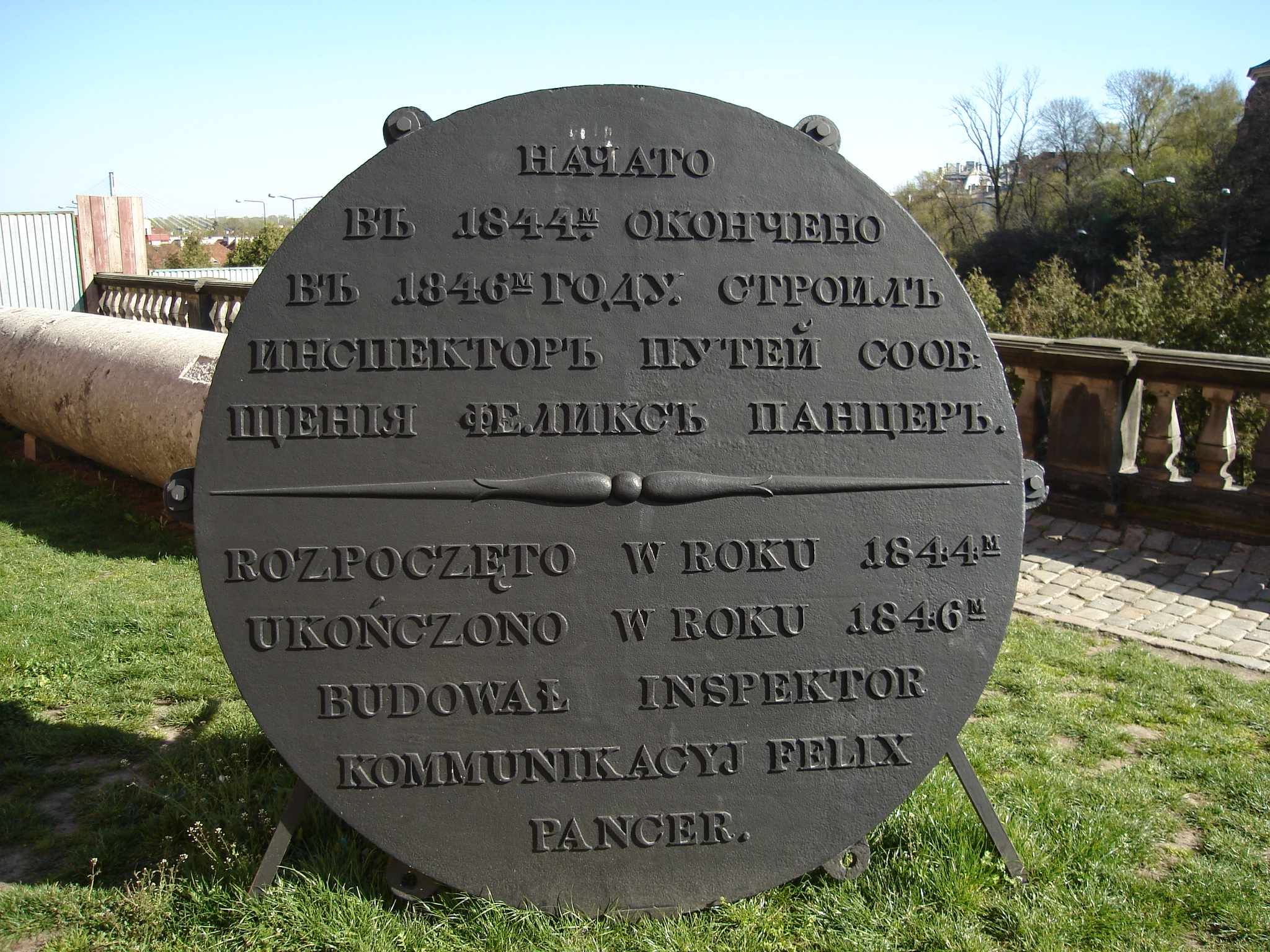
Plaque from the Pancer Viaduct

The Pancer Viaduct was a viaduct in Warsaw joining Castle Square to the Kierbedzia Bridge. It was built in 1846, and demolished in 1944 and was replaced by the Warsaw W-Z Route thoroughfare.

It was designed by Felix Pancer and constructed with seven arched vaults made of brick, supported by six pillars and two abutments.

Initially, New Downhill Street (ulica Nowy Zjazd) allowed travel from Castle Square to Dobra Street along the viaduct. The street had the shape of the letter "J", reaching the Vistula, and then turning back sharply and steeply towards Dobra Street. After the construction of the Alexander Bridge (commonly called the Kierbedzia Bridge) in 1864, New Downhill Street running over the Pancer Viaduct became the main artery leading from the left-bank of Warsaw to Praga on the right-bank.

Tram tracks were on the viaduct from the very beginning. Initially it was a horse-drawn tram line belonging to the railway, which was built to connect the Praga broad gauge line to the standard gauge of the Warsaw-Vienna line. This became the nucleus of the tram network in Warsaw. The original plans for the Kierbedzia Bridge included a rail line to perform this function but the rail part of this plan was abandoned.

The viaduct was blown up after the Warsaw Uprising. Retreating German troops blew up the penultimate pillar, causing two adjacent spans to collapse.

After the war, there were plans to rebuild the viaduct, but they were abandoned because the significant increase in pedestrian and automobile traffic would have been dangerous for Castle Square and the Old Town. Under the intersection of Krakowskie Przedmieście and Miodowa Street a tunnel was built for the W-Z Route which resulted in the need to reduce the road. The Pancer Viaduct was demolished, and a road was built from the tunnel to the Śląsko-Dąbrowski Bridge (which replaced the demolished Kierbedzia Bridge) on new embankments and viaducts.

The only surviving part of the viaduct is a plaque commemorating its construction. It can be found in Castle Square, next to fragments of previous versions of Sigismund's Column. It includes an inscription in Russian and Polish.
