= Anna Jagiellon =

Ruler of Poland–Lithuania from 1575 to 1587

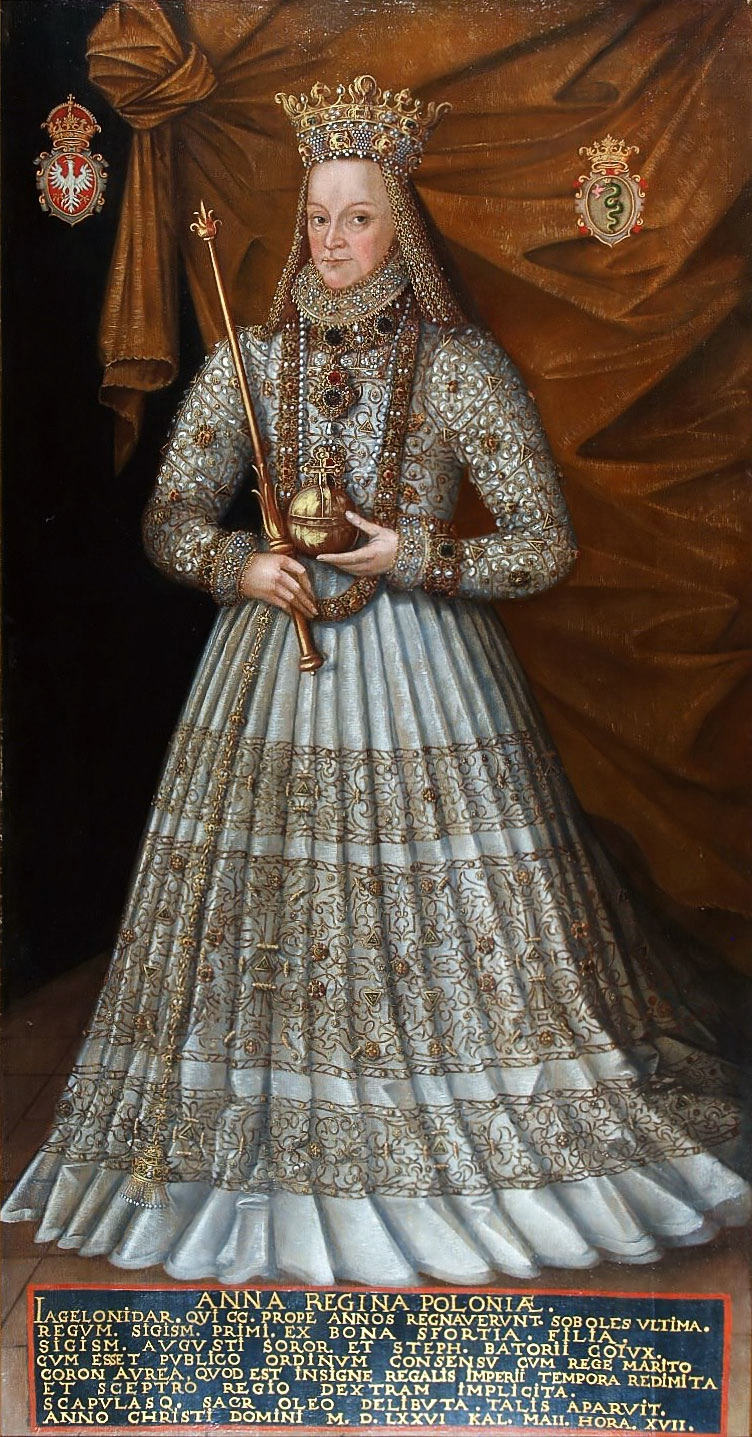
- Queen Anna in her coronation robes (1576 painting by Martin Kober)

Queen of Poland Grand Duchess of Lithuania
- Reign: 15 December 1575 – 19 August 1587
- Coronation: 1 May 1576 in Kraków
- Predecessor: Henry of Valois
- Successor: Sigismund III Vasa
- Co-monarch: Stephen Báthory (1576–1586)
- Born: 18 October 1523; Kraków, Kingdom of Poland
- Died: 9 September 1596 (aged 72); Warsaw, Polish–Lithuanian Commonwealth
- Burial: Wawel Cathedral
- Spouse: Stephen Báthory (m. 1576; died 1586)
- Dynasty: Jagiellon
- Father: Sigismund I the Old
- Mother: Bona Sforza
- Religion: Roman Catholicism

Anna Jagiellon (/ˌjɑːɡjəˈləʊn/; Polish: Anna Jagiellonka, Lithuanian: Ona Jogailaitė; 18 October 1523 – 9 September 1596) was Queen of Poland and Grand Duchess of Lithuania from 1575 to 1587.

Daughter of Polish King and Lithuanian Grand Duke Sigismund I the Old and Italian duchess Bona Sforza, Anna received multiple proposals, but remained unmarried until the age of 52. After the death of King Sigismund II Augustus, her brother and the last male member of the Jagiellonian dynasty, her hand was sought by pretenders to the Polish-Lithuanian throne to maintain the dynastic tradition. Along with her then-fiancé Stephen Báthory, Anna was elected as co-ruler in the 1576 royal election of the Polish–Lithuanian Commonwealth. Their marriage was a formal arrangement and distant.

While Báthory was preoccupied with the Livonian War, Anna spent her time on local administrative matters and several construction projects, including the city wall Stara Prochownia to protect Sigismund Augustus Bridge. After her husband's death in December 1586, Anna had the opportunity to remain on the throne as the sole ruler, but instead promoted her nephew Sigismund III Vasa, whose reign established the House of Vasa on the Polish-Lithuanian throne for the next 80 years (1587–1668).

== Childhood ==
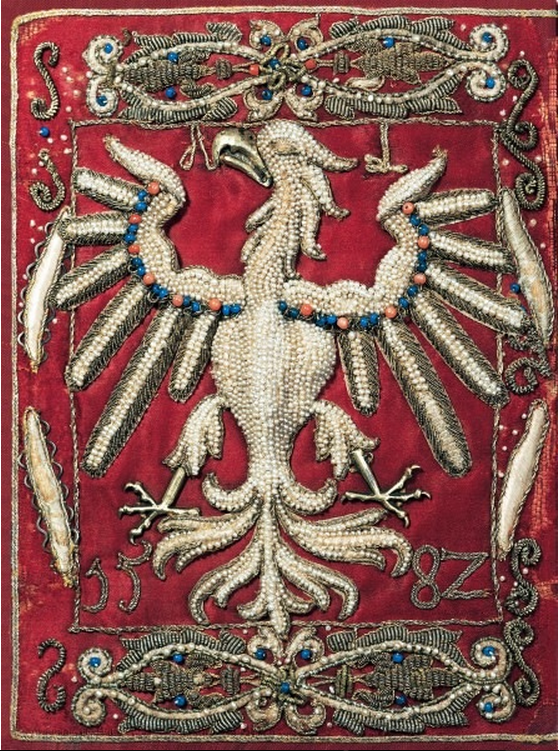
One of Anna's embroideries: Coat of arms of Poland in silver and gold thread with white pearls on a book from the royal library. It was given to Kraków Academy.

Anna Jagiellon was born on 18 October 1523 in Kraków, Kingdom of Poland. Her parents were the King Sigismund I the Old and Queen Bona Sforza. She spent most of her childhood in Kraków with her sisters Sophia and Catherine. From June 1533 to November 1536 and from April 1540 to June 1542, the younger sisters were left alone in Kraków while the rest of the family was in the Grand Duchy of Lithuania. That meant that the three sisters grew closer, but were more distant from their elder brother Sigismund Augustus.

Like all her siblings, Anna received a good education. She was well-versed in architecture and finances, as well as fluent in Italian and Latin. In her free time, she embroidered and sewed beautiful tapestries (many of which survive), played chess and dice, and was involved in works of charity.

== Marriage proposals ==
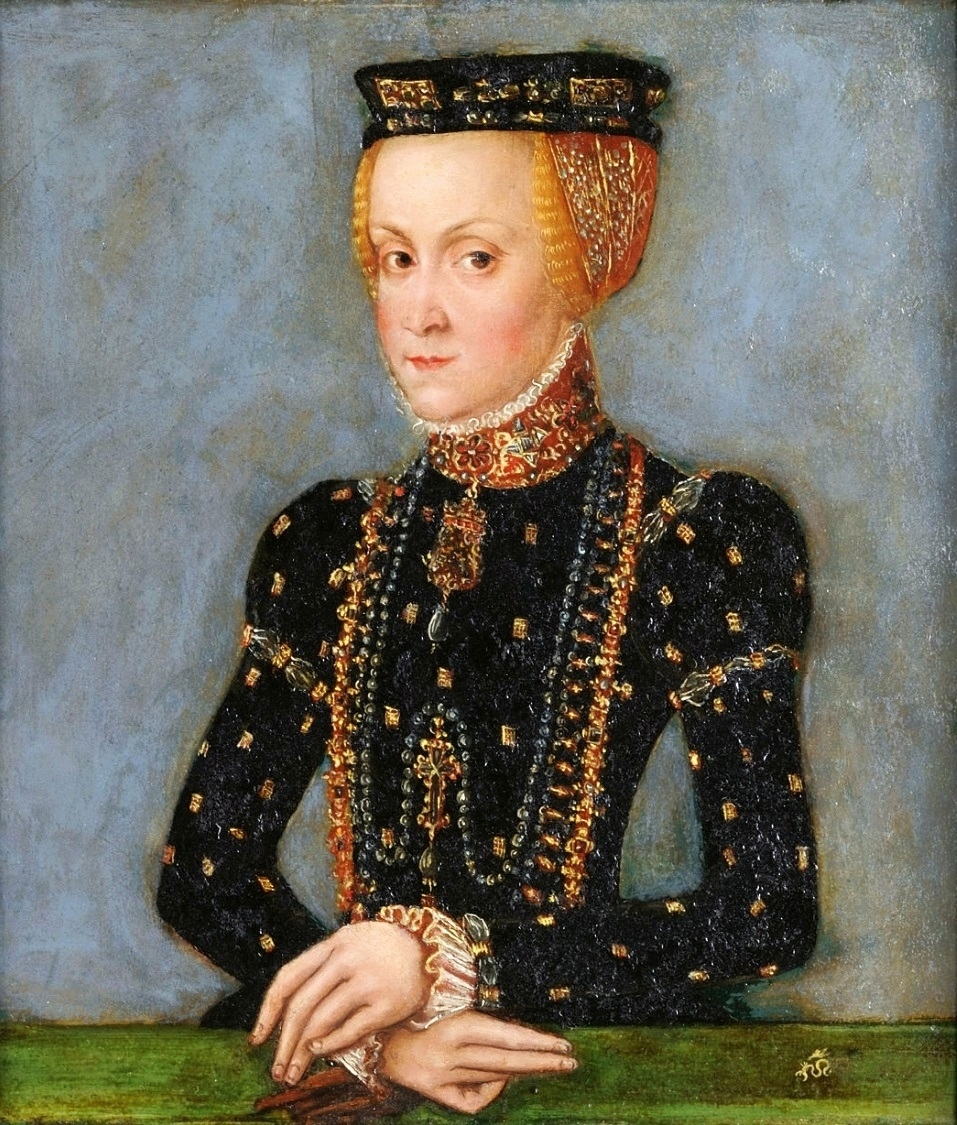
Anna Jagiellon by Lucas Cranach the Younger, 1553.

Both their parents neglected the issue of the marriage of the youngest three Jagiellon sisters. Only after their father's death in 1548, the first serious candidate for a husband emerged – Albert Alcibiades, Margrave of Brandenburg-Kulmbach, but he was a Hohenzollern and a Protestant, had debts and a bad temper. In the summer of 1548, after a conflict with King Sigismund II Augustus over his secret marriage with Barbara Radziwiłł, Queen Mother Bona and her unmarried daughters moved to Mazovia, mainly Warsaw and Ujazdów Castle. In 1550, Bona attempted to negotiate marriage with Charles Victor or Philip, sons of Henry V, Duke of Brunswick-Lüneburg, or Prince Ernest of Bavaria. After a family meeting in May 1552 in Płock, Sigismund II Augustus considered marrying his sisters to King Gustav I of Sweden, Dukes John Frederick II and Johann Wilhelm of Saxony, and Duke John Albert I of Mecklenburg, but lacked resolve and consistency. In January 1556, Bona managed to arrange a marriage for Sophia. A month later, Bona departed for her native Italy, leaving her two unmarried daughters alone in Warsaw.

After about a year, Sigismund II Augustus brought his sisters to Vilnius, where they became close to his third wife, Catherine of Austria. Even though Anna was already in her mid-thirties, Sigismund investigated marriage proposals. Widowed Ferdinand I, Holy Roman Emperor, did not want to remarry; his unmarried son Charles II (born 1540) was too young; Tsar Ivan the Terrible was not deemed beneficial for Poland–Lithuania; and John Frederick, Duke of Pomerania did not want an alliance with Poland and Lithuania as it would have drawn the Duchy of Pomerania into the Livonian War. King Eric XIV of Sweden was personally more interested in pursuing marriage with Queen Elizabeth I of England, but sought an alliance with Poland–Lithuania and suggested his half-brother John, Duke of Finland. John agreed, but asked for Catherine. It was against custom for a younger sister to marry first; their wedding was postponed. Three more grooms were proposed for Anna: Danish prince Magnus was supposed to become a Lutheran bishop which would be an unacceptable marriage for the Kingdom's Catholic majority; the last Master of the Livonian Order Gotthard Kettler was not of royal blood and his control of Livonia was tenuous; and John's younger brother, Magnus, Duke of Östergötland. Sigismund II Augustus agreed to the double Polish–Swedish alliance, but only John arrived at the wedding in Vilnius. The court demanded that John marry Anna, but he insisted on Catherine. Needing Swedish troops and money in the Livonian War, Sigismund II Augustus relented if Anna did not protest. Though it must have been humiliating, Anna agreed and Catherine married John on 4 October 1562.

As Vilnius wasn't safe due to the Livonian War, Anna moved to the Royal Castle in Warsaw and lived there for about ten years with a court of about 70 people. She spent her time playing games, embroidering, praying, and corresponding with her sisters. Her brother visited her annually when he attended sessions of the general sejm ("Parliament") in Warsaw. Even though Anna was already in her forties, marriage proposals continued to come in. In 1564, Reichard, Count Palatine of Simmern-Sponheim, proposed but perhaps was deterred by her relatively small dowry of 32,000 Polish red złoty. In 1568, her sister Sophia proposed to Eberhard, eldest son of Christoph, Duke of Württemberg, but he died the same year. In 1569, a project emerged to marry Anna to Barnim X, Duke of Pomerania, who demanded that she would bring eight border territories as her dowry, which was unacceptable to Poland. In 1572, Sophia proposed Albert Frederick, Duke of Prussia, but Sigismund II Augustus refused.

== Interregnums ==
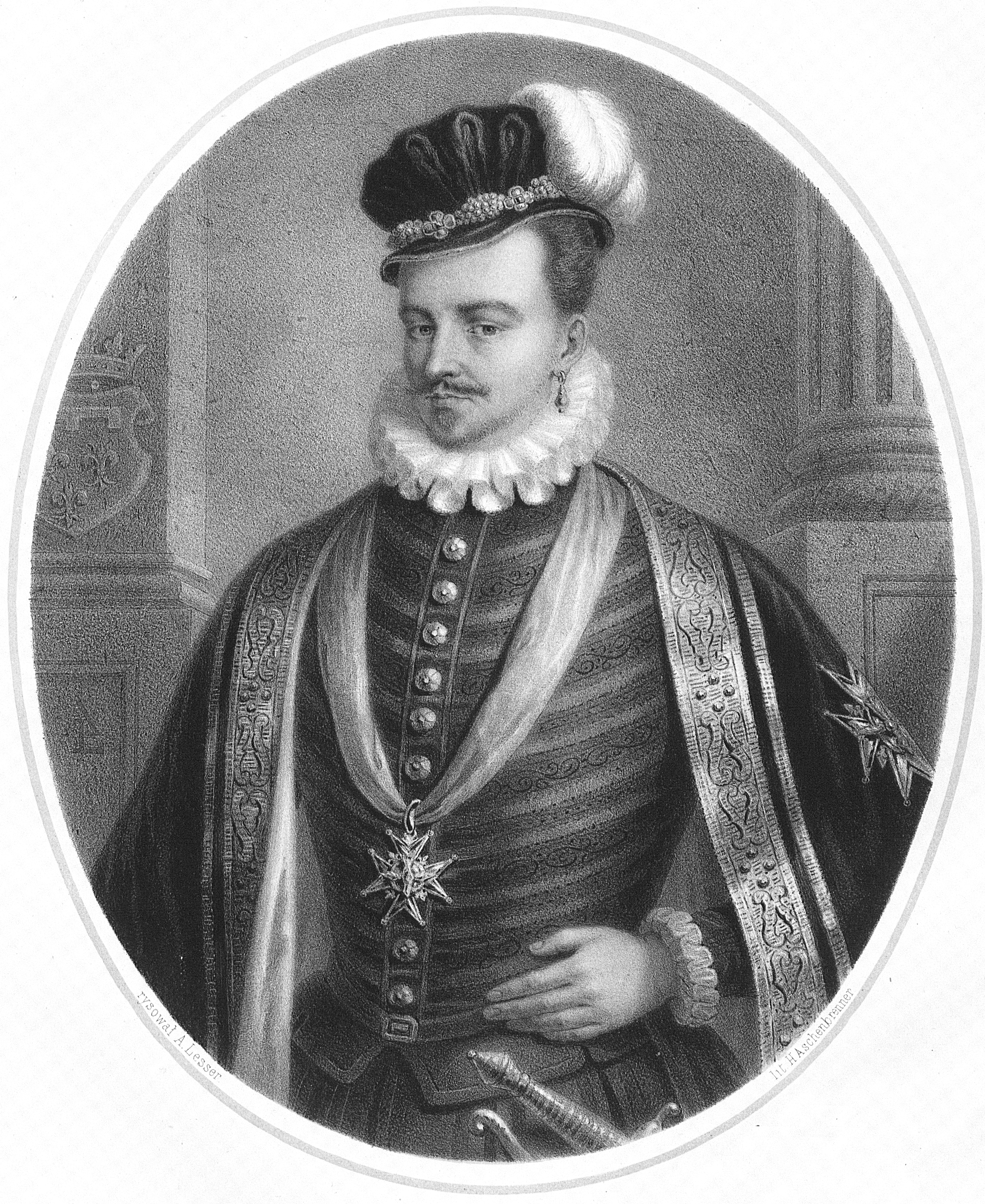
Polish likeness of Henry III, whom Anne supported and succeeded.

In July 1572, her brother Sigismund II Augustus died, leaving the throne of the Polish–Lithuanian Commonwealth vacant. His death changed Anna's status from a neglected spinster to the heiress of the Jagiellon dynasty. Sigismund left all the wealth of the Jagiellon dynasty to his three sisters, but the Commonwealth nobility did not allow a private person to inherit royal possessions. Thus, Anna received only a small portion of her inheritance, but still became a very rich woman. She left Warsaw and traveled to Piaseczno, Płock and Łomża.

Jean de Monluc, Bishop of Valence, offered the French Prince Henry de Valois to the electors of the Commonwealth as the next King and Grand Duke. Among other things, Montluc promised the electors that Henry would marry the heiress of the Jagiellons to maintain the dynastic tradition. Although Polish-Lithuanian nobles sought to keep her out of the political arena, Anna learned of Henry's offer in spring 1573 and became his strong supporter, flattered that he "cared for her and not only for the Kingdom". With her support, he was elected as King of Poland and Grand Duke of Lithuania on 11 May 1573 and officially crowned on 21 February 1574. However, due to an oversight (whether intentional or unintentional), Henrician Articles (Henry's pre-election treaty) did not include the promise to marry the Jagiellon heiress and so he tarried. When it became apparent that Henry would not marry her, Anna was humiliated. In June 1574, he left Poland to assume his new duties as King of France, and by May 1575, the Parliament of the Commonwealth had removed him as their monarch.

During the second interregnum, Anna assumed the unprecedented but politically important title of Infanta, mirroring the Spanish custom and highlighting her dynastic status. Poland did not recognise the status of crown prince since, technically, the monarchy was not hereditary but elective between the native noble families and foreign royalty. Despite this, she still referred to herself as "Anna, by the Grace of God, Infanta of the Kingdom of Poland" (Latin: "Anna Dei Gratia Infans Regni Poloniae"). She wanted to marry and become Queen of Poland, but deceived by the French, she was a lot more careful and did not voice her support publicly. She was skeptical of marriage proposals by Archduke Ernest of Austria, Alfonso II d'Este, Duke of Ferrara, and Frederick IV of Liegnitz. In December 1575, diplomat Jan Zamoyski proposed to elect Anna. As ancient laws did not allow an unmarried woman to rule, Stephen Báthory, Voivode of Transylvania, was proposed as her husband. On 15 December 1575, in Wola near Warsaw, Anna and Báthory were elected as co-rulers of the Polish–Lithuanian Commonwealth. However, the Lithuanian delegation did not participate in the election and did not recognize its results. Only on 29 June 1576, already after the coronation ceremony, Lithuanian nobility agreed to recognize the couple.

== Reign ==
On 28 February 1576, Anna entered Kraków as the officially elected queen. Báthory joined her on 23 April. On 1 May, they were married and crowned at Wawel Cathedral. The Queen spent most of her time in Warsaw and Ujazdów Castle.

=== Construction projects ===
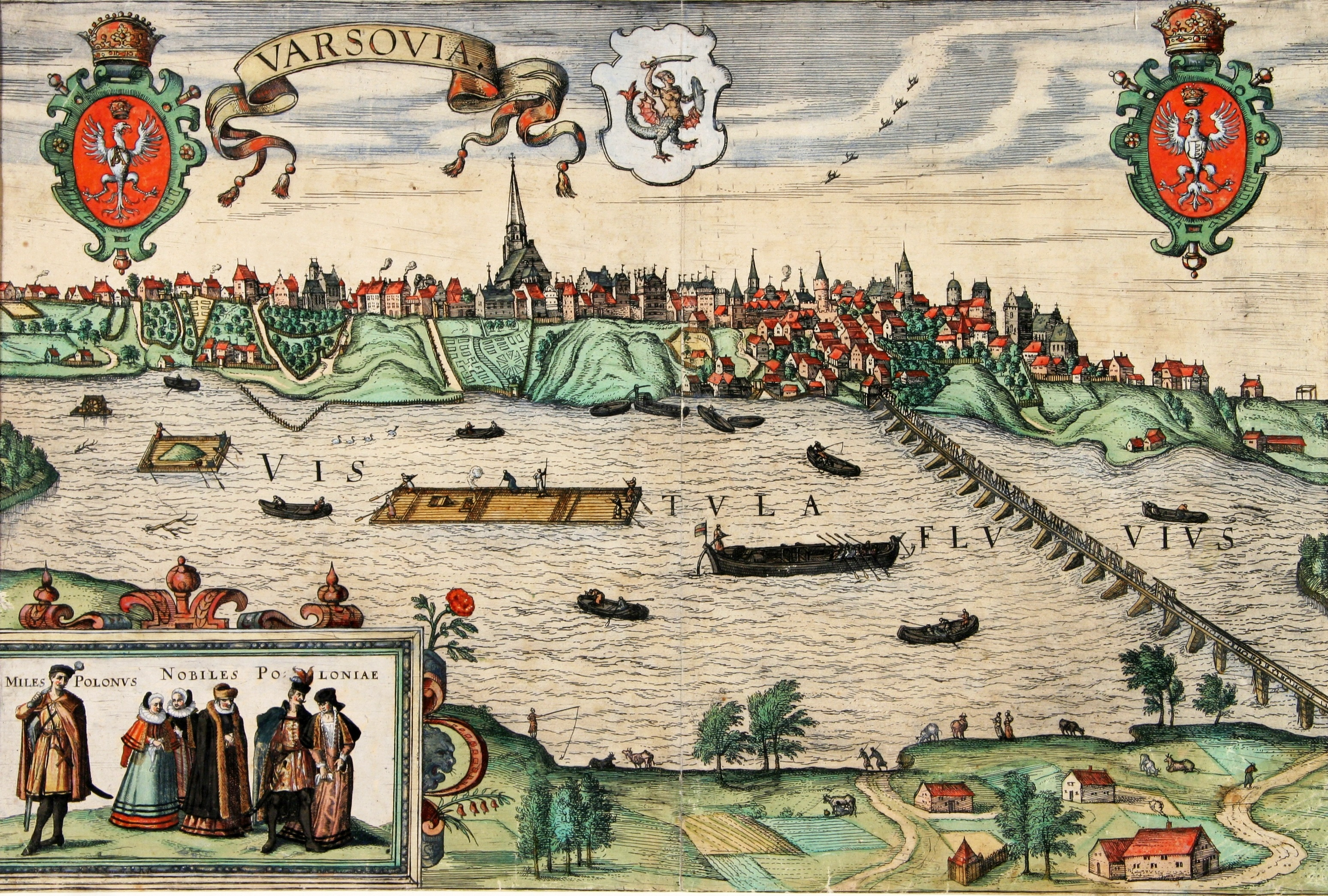
Sigismund Augustus Bridge was finished and protected by Queen Anne.

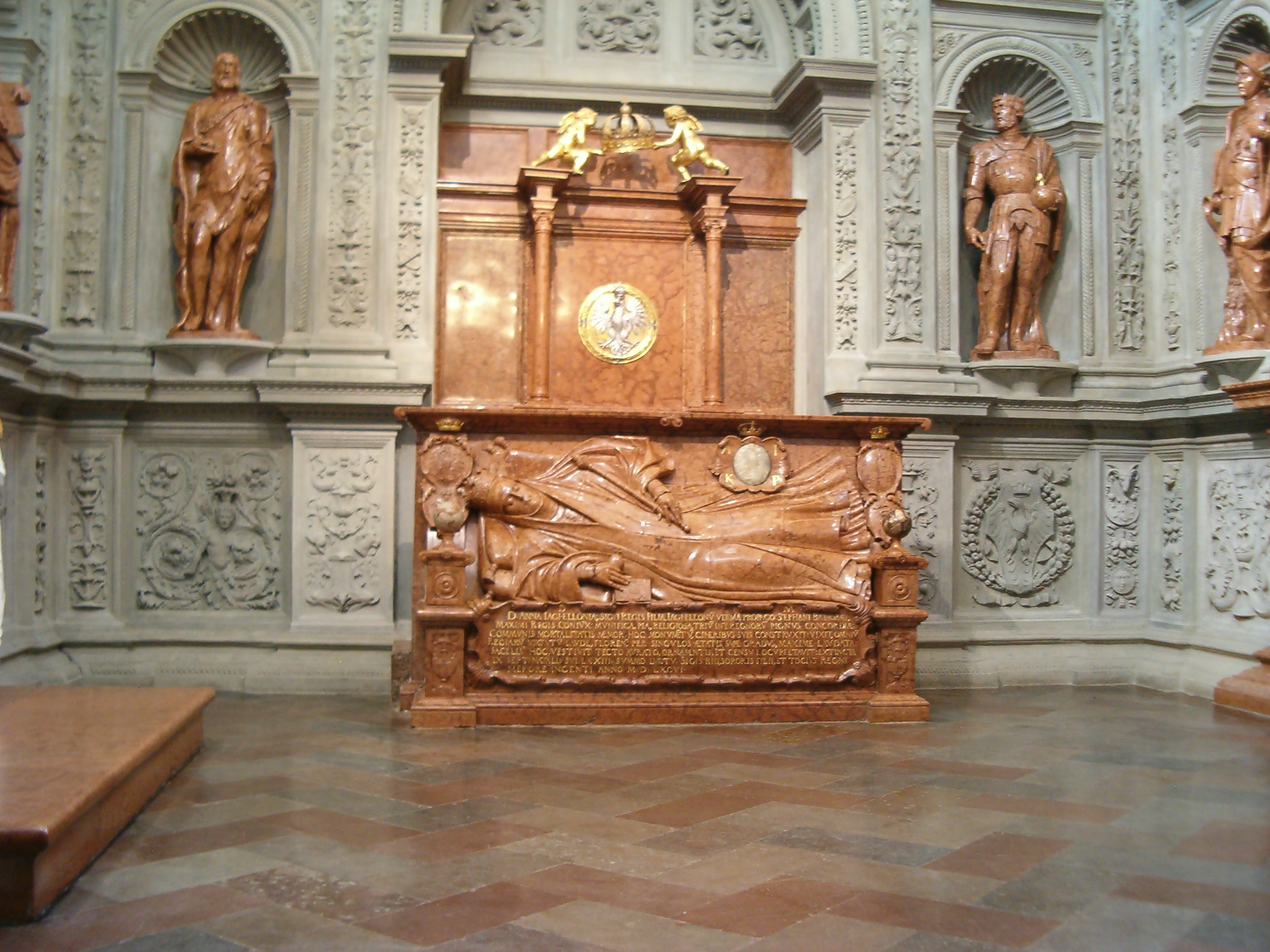
Queen Anna's tomb in the Sigismund's Chapel was built during her lifetime.

Although she was forced to surrender the inheritance from her brother after her coronation; in return Anna received some of his properties for her lifetime, Mazovian properties that once belonged to her mother, the treasury kept at Tykocin, a one-time payment of 60,000 gold coins, income from Wieliczka Salt Mine, and interest on her mother's loan to King Philip II of Spain (the loan was never fully repaid and is known as Neapolitan sums). Anna was supposed to share that interest with her sister Catherine, but apparently never did.

Receiving substantial income, Anna sponsored and supervised several construction projects. She completed the reconstruction of the Royal Castle in Warsaw, Ujazdów Castle, and the Sigismund Augustus Bridge over Vistula River, the longest wooden bridge in Europe at the time, at 500 meters in length. She built the city wall Stara Prochownia, known as the Bridge Gate, to protect the wooden bridge from fire; the tomb monument of her brother in the Sigismund's Chapel from to 1574 to 1575 and 1584 with the help of architect Santi Gucci; and the tomb of her mother in the Basilica di San Nicola in Bari from 1589 to 1595. Around the same time, she built her own tomb in Sigismund's Chapel.

=== Marriage ===
Although there were rumors that Anna had not had her menopause and thus could still conceive, her marriage was a formal affair. The couple were distant and would see each other only a few weeks a year when Báthory, generally preoccupied with the Livonian War, attended the general sejm in Warsaw. She supported her husband with money for weapons, but was visibly upset because she sought a closer personal relationship and greater political influence. This was also Báthory's loss as he failed to gain a valuable political ally. There were rumours that he might seek a divorce so he could marry a younger woman and father an heir, which further alienated Anna, who even approached anti-Báthory groups and opposed his Livonian campaign. Upon her husband's death in 1586, she refused his burial in Sigismund's Chapel; perhaps it was her retribution for the distant marriage, as traditions dictated that husband and wife should not be separated in death. Stephen Báthory was buried in the Chapel of the Blessed Virgin Mary, though his wife did order his tomb monument in 1589.

=== Polish succession ===
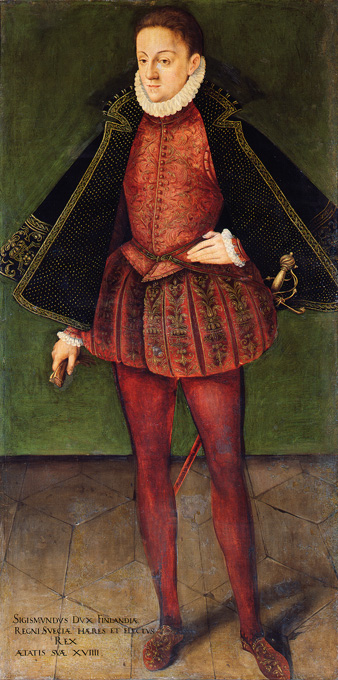
Anna's nephew and successor, Sigismund Vasa, in his youth.

After her husband's death in December 1586, Anna had the opportunity to claim the political power in the Commonwealth for herself as she was an elected queen and grand duchess, but instead resolved to promote her niece Anna Vasa or her nephew Sigismund Vasa, the only children of her beloved sister Catherine and King John III of Sweden. Her initial plan, formulated while her husband was still alive, was to wed Anna Vasa to one of the nephews of Stephen Báthory and promote the couple to the throne. However, this plan did not gain support among the nobility and she then planned to sponsor Sigismund Vasa to the throne. As a backup plan, she pursued marriage between Anna Vasa and Maximilian III, Archduke of Austria, the other likely candidate for the throne. Initially, King John III did not want to let his only son and heir out of his sight, but Queen Anna managed to convince him. In her campaigns, she wrote numerous letters and used her wealth to gain crucial support from Zamoyski, who was married to Griselda Báthory and held his own ambitions for the throne. Sigismund Vasa was elected king on 19 August 1587. He and his sister Anna arrived in Poland in October 1587.

== Later years ==
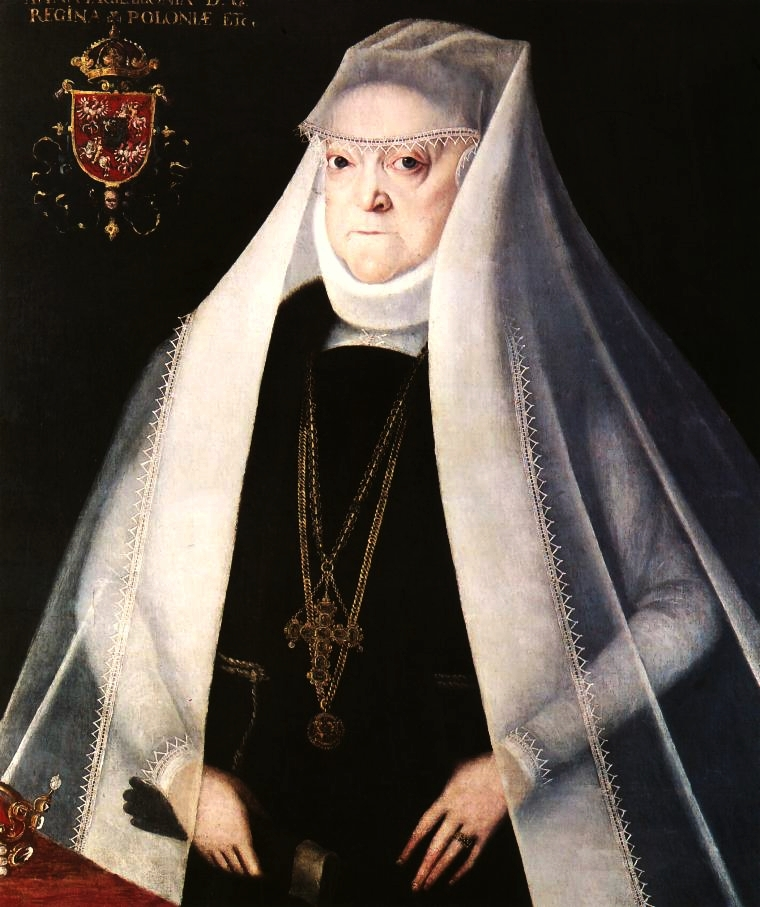
Anna Jagiellon as a widow by Marcin Kober

After the coronation and the brief War of the Polish Succession, Anna and her niece settled in Warsaw while Sigismund spent most of his time in Kraków. She became attached to her nephew, participating in his wedding with Anne of Austria and the baptism of their firstborn, Anna Maria.

After his father's death in November 1592, Sigismund Vasa spent about a year in Sweden. During that time, his newborn daughter was entrusted to the Polish Infanta's care. In July 1595, she was the godmother of Władysław Vasa, the future King of Poland and Grand Duke of Lithuania. A happier Anna died in Warsaw on 9 September 1596 at the age of 72 as the last Jagiellon.

== See also ==
- List of Polish monarchs
- Anna Jagiellon Bridge, Warsaw

== Bibliography ==
- Dmitrieva, Marina; Lambrecht, Karen (2000). Krakau, Prag und Wien: Funktionen von Metropolen im frühmodernen Staat (in German). Franz Steiner Verlag. ISBN 3-515-07792-8. "In der Zeit des zweiten Interregnums trug sie den Titel "Anna Dei Gratia Infans Regni Poloniae"."
- Duczmal, Małgorzata (2012). Jogailaičiai (in Lithuanian). Translated by Birutė Mikalonienė and Vyturys Jarutis. Vilnius: Mokslo ir enciklopedijų leidybos centras. ISBN 978-5-420-01703-6.
- Kiaupienė, Jūratė; Lukšaitė, Ingė (2013). Lietuvos istorija. Veržli naujųjų laikų pradžia. Lietuvos Didžioji Kunigaikštystė 1529–1588 metais (in Lithuanian). Vol. V. Baltos lankos. ISBN 978-9955-23-680-1.
- Letkiewicz, Ewa (2006). Klejnoty w Polsce: Czasy ostatnich Jagiellonów i Wazów (in Polish). Wydawnictwo Uniwersytetu Marii Curie-Skłodowskiej. ISBN 83-227-2599-X.
- Stone, Daniel (2001). The Polish-Lithuanian state, 1386–1795. A History of East Central Europe. Seattle: University of Washington Press. ISBN 0-295-98093-1.

Anna Jagiellon House of Jagiellon Born: 18 October 1523 Died: 9 September 1596
Regnal titles
Vacant Interrex Title last held by Henry de Valois	Queen of Poland; Grand Duchess of Lithuania; 1575 – 1587 with Stephen Báthory	Vacant Interrex Title next held by Sigismund Vasa
