= Kierbedź Bridge =

Kierbedź Bridge Most Kierbedzia
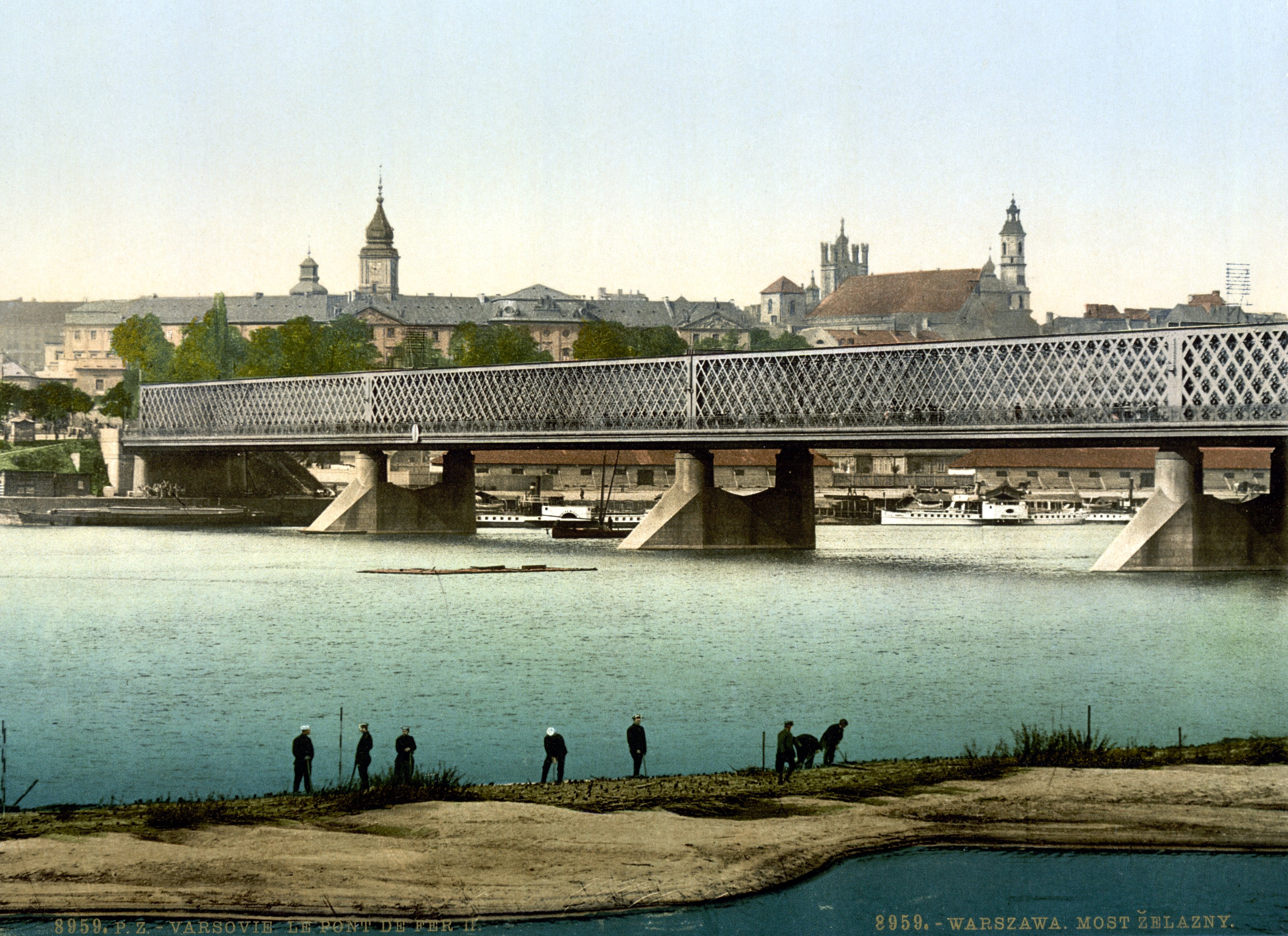
- The bridge in 1900
- Coordinates: 52°14′58″N 21°1′22″E
- Carried: Road transport, Trams
- Crossed: Vistula River
- Locale: Warsaw

Characteristics
- Total length: 474 m
- Width: • Overall: 17.5 m • Roadway: 10.5 m • Sidewalks: 2 x 3.5 m
- No. of spans: 6

History
- Architect: Stanisław Kierbedź
- Construction start: 1859
- Construction end: 1864
- Construction cost: 2.7 million rubles
- Collapsed: 5 August 1915; 13 September 1944

The Kierbedź Bridge was the first steel bridge over the Vistula River in Warsaw. It was designed by Stanisław Kierbedź and built between 1859 and 1864. The bridge had six spans and was 474 m long.

== History ==
The bridge was built at the initiative of the Society of Russian Railways. It was first planned to be a railway bridge connecting the Petersburg train station (now Warszawa Wileńska station) with the Vienna train station (Dworzec Wiedeński, which was demolished in 1944). These plans were abandoned with the bridge built solely for road transport (with tracks for horse-drawn trams). A railway bridge north of it, Citadel Rail Bridge, was built a few years later at the Warsaw Citadel.

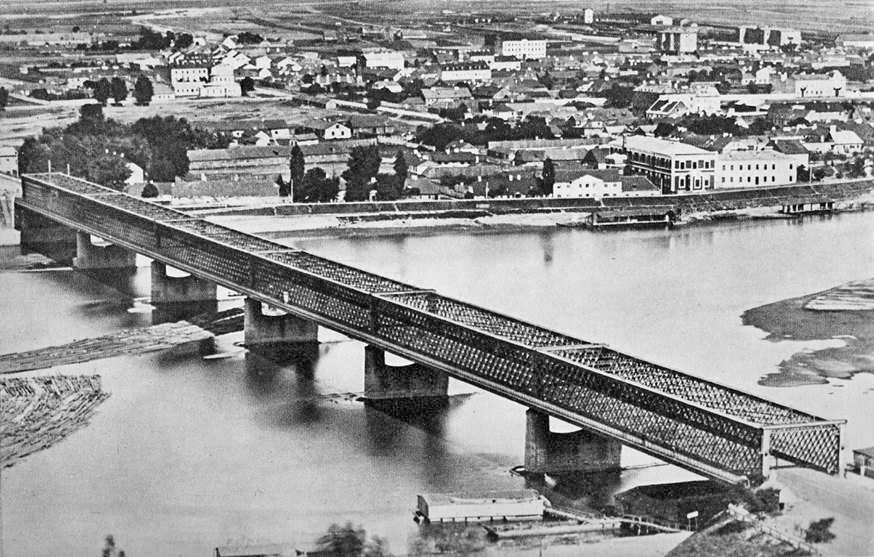
The Kierbedż Bridge seen from the tower of the Royal Castle, in the 1870s

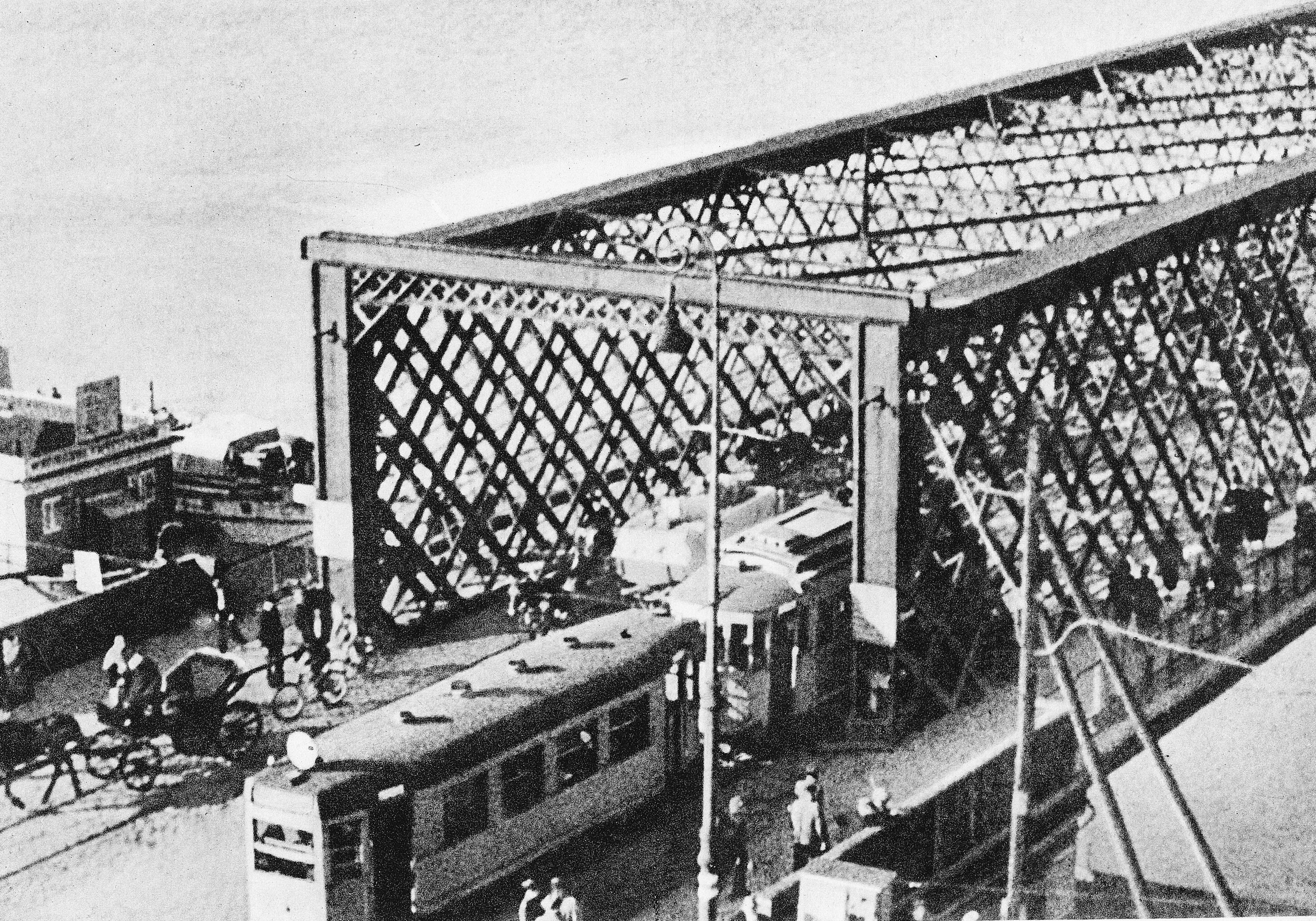
The entrance to the bridge

Although Kierbedź Bridge was the first permanent bridge since the Sigismund Augustus Bridge in the 16th century, and the construction of the permanent bridge had been passed in parliament, construction was barely mentioned by the press.

The total cost of construction was 2.7 million rubles. Stanisław Kierbedź was the main designer and the works were carried out by the French companies "Gouin et C-ie the Batignolles" and "Schneider Creuzot", whose representatives were a French engineer called Gottard and the Polish engineer and inventor Stanisław Janicki.

The bridge opened on November 22, 1864.

At the time of Partitions of Poland, it was officially named the Alexander Bridge (Most Aleksandryjski, named after Tsar Alexander II). The bridge was commonly known as the Kierbedź Bridge (after the designer and builder). Following the restoration of Poland's independence, this became the official name.

On August 5, 1915, at around 6 am, Russian troops withdrawing from Warsaw blew up the two middle spans, without damaging the pillars. The bridge was rebuilt in 1916, but the new trusses differed from those designed by Kierbedź (their top belt had a parabolic shape).

=== World War II and the postwar period ===
The bridge was once again destroyed on September 13, 1944 by the retreating German army as the Red Army approached on the right bank of the Vistula.

After World War II, a new bridge, called the Śląsko-Dąbrowski Bridge, was built on the surviving pillars of the bridge and coincided with the demolition of the Pancer Viaduct (Wiadukt Pancera) as part of the construction of the new Route WZ.

In September 2011, at the request of the Department of Bridges (part of the Research Institute of Roads and Bridges), a 6-foot piece of truss from the Kierbedź bridge was recovered from the Vistula to be presented for public viewing.

== The bridge on film ==
In the sixth episode of the cult television show, Four Tank Men and a Dog, entitled Bridge (1966), the heroes arrive on the Kierbedź Bridge from Praga. The bridge used for filming was actually in Toruń, because of its similar design which also had tram tracks. The same bridge in Toruń (now known as the Józef Piłsudski Road Bridge) also stood in for the Kierbedź Bridge in the film Zamach, directed by Jerzy Passendorfer in 1958.

== Gallery ==
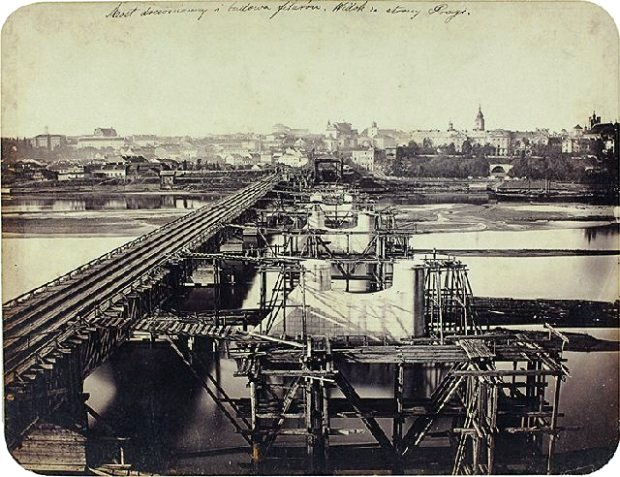
A photo by Karol Beyer of the construction of the bridge, 1862

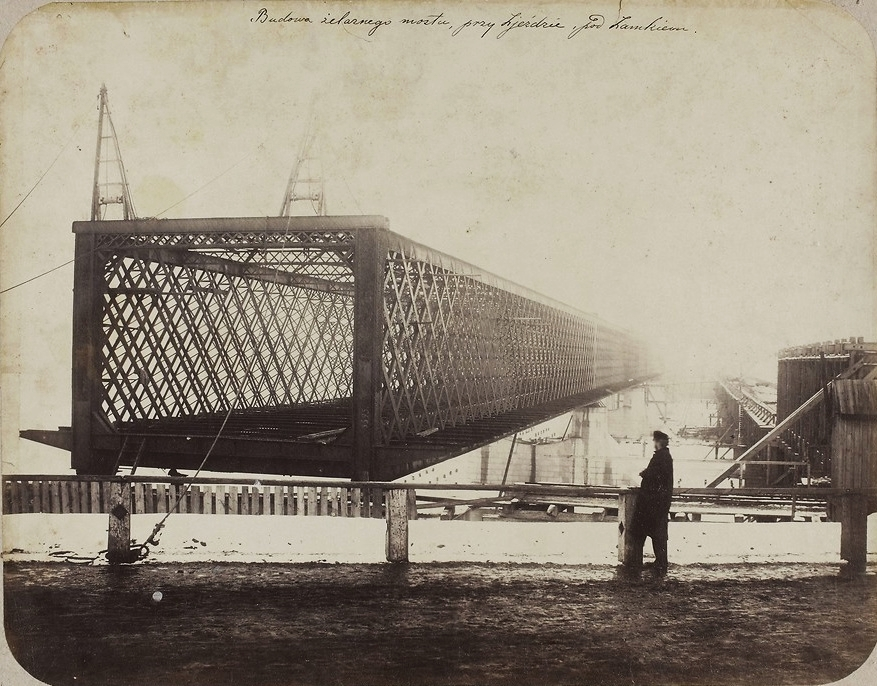
A photo by Karol Beyer of the construction of the bridge, 1864

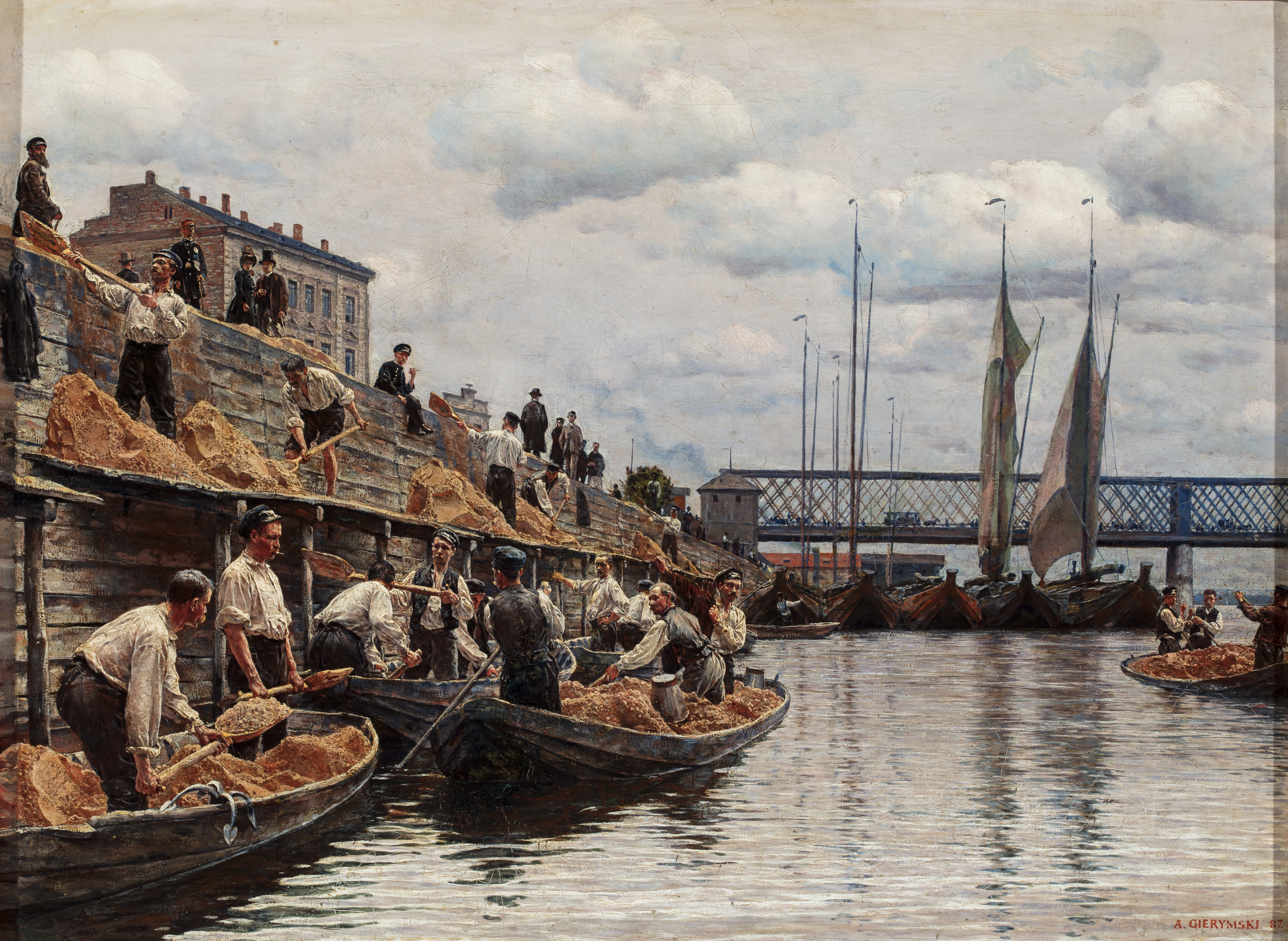
A painting by Aleksander Gierymski, Piaskarze, which shows the bridge, 1887

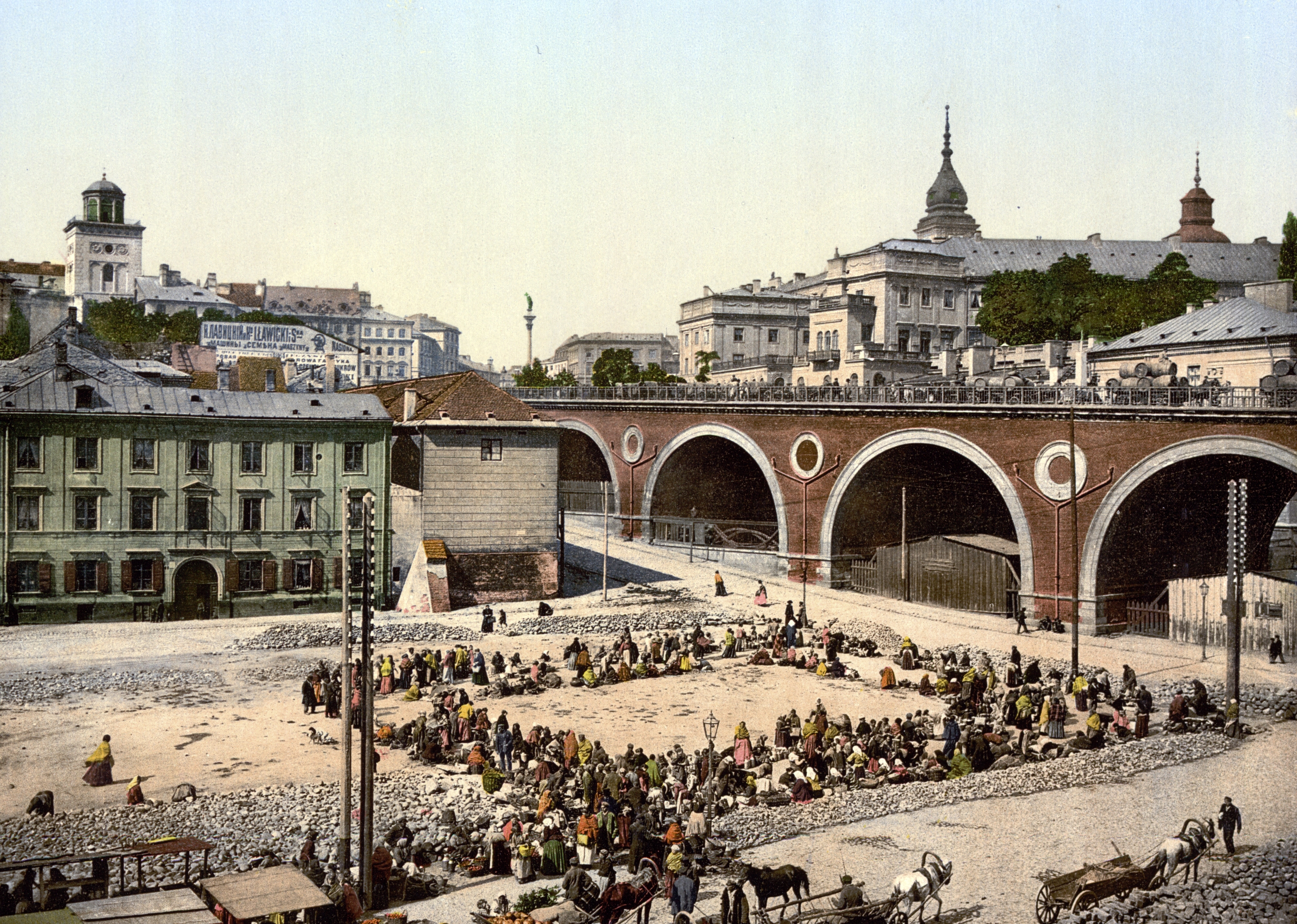
The adjoining Wiadukt Pancera (Pancera Viaduct), 1890

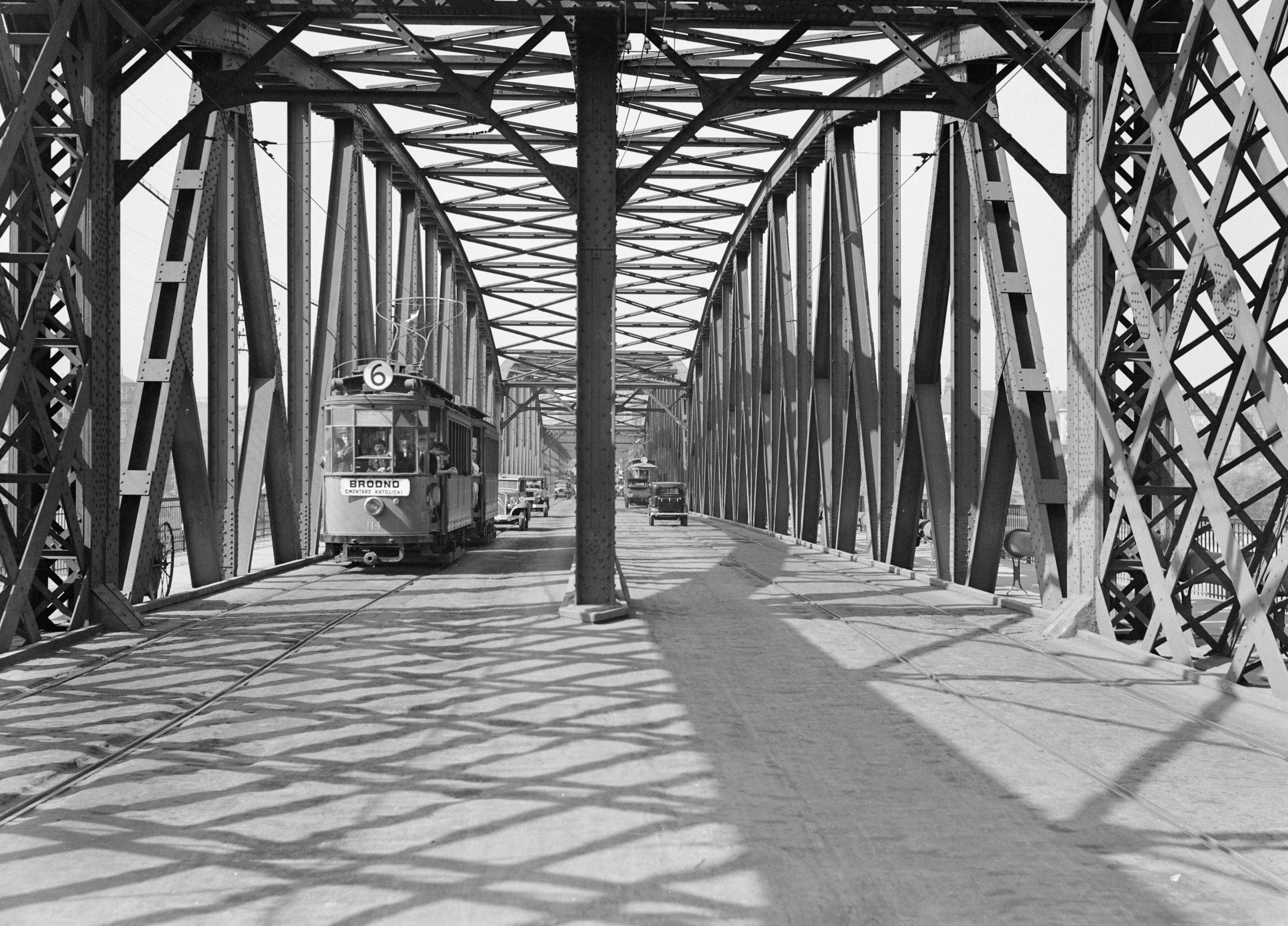
The bridge in 1934, showing the replacement curved spans

== See also ==
- Timeline of Polish science and technology
