= Kazanowski family =

Polish noble family

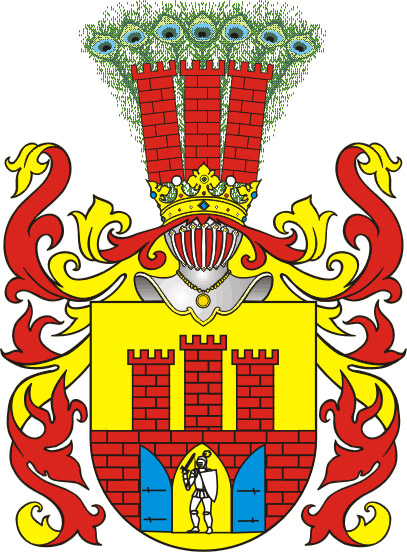
The family coat of arms was Grzymała.

The Kazanowski family (plural: Kazanowscy) was a Polish noble family, magnates in the 16th and 17th century. Their origins are traced either to Kazanów in Opoczno County or Kazanów near Lubartów.

== Notable members ==
- Dominik Kazanowski (d. 1485) – one of the first notable members of the family in Poland. In 1473 he was granted royal permission to buy Biała.
- Zygmunt Kazanowski (1563–1634)
- Marcin Kazanowski (1563/66–1636)
- Adam Kazanowski (1599–1649)
- Dominik Aleksander Kazanowski (1605–1648)
- Marianna Kazanowska (1643–1687)

== Gallery ==
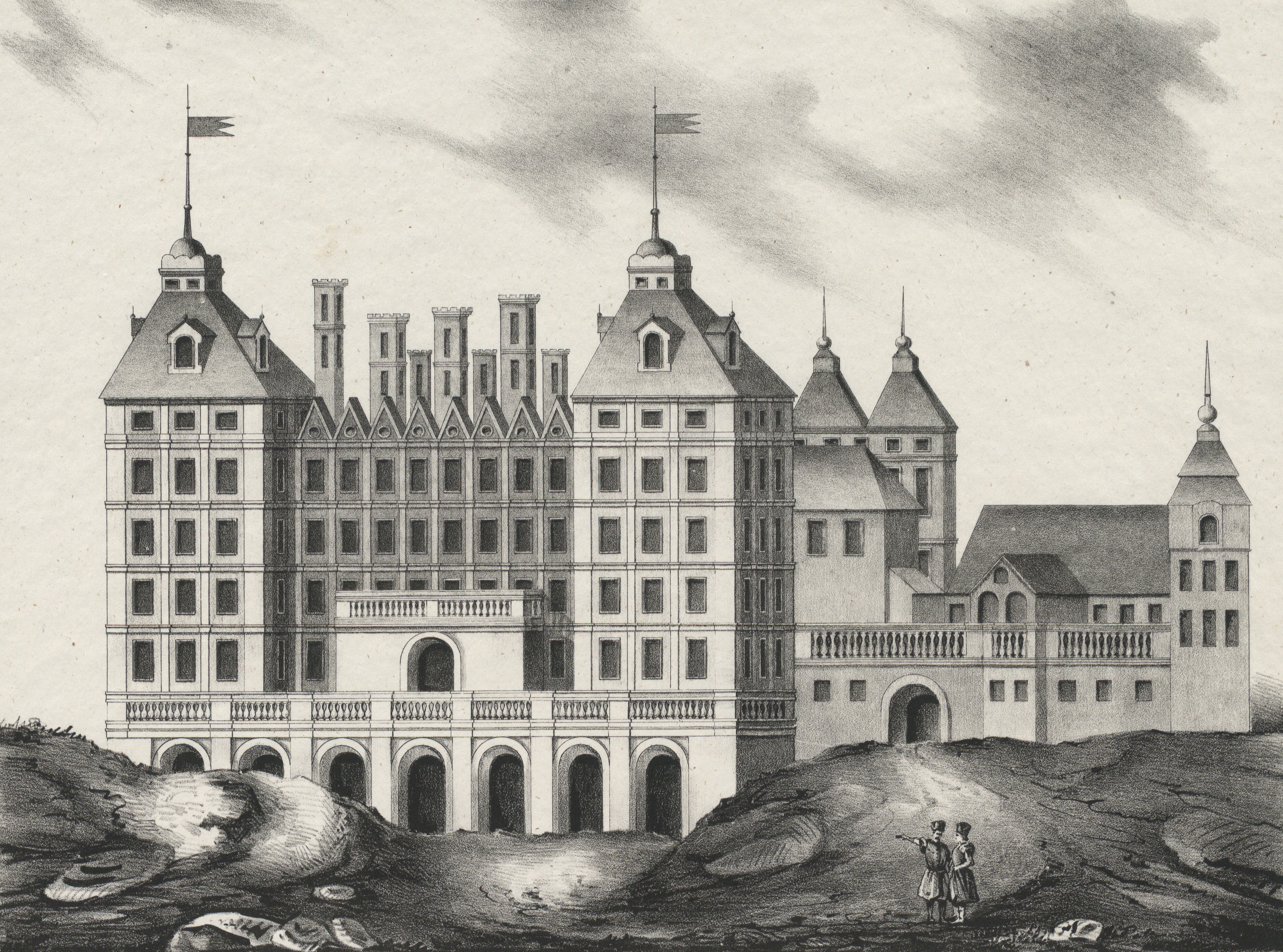
Kazanowski Palace in Warsaw

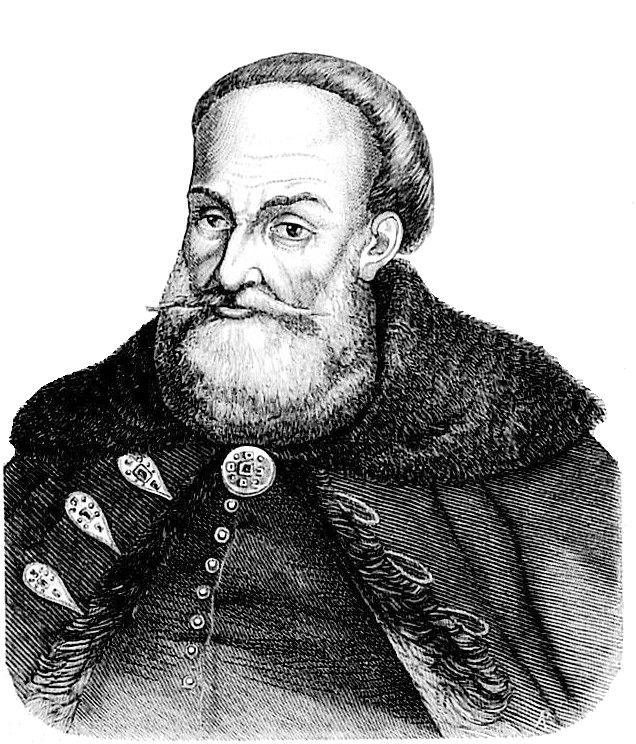
Marcin Kazanowski (1563/1566-1636)

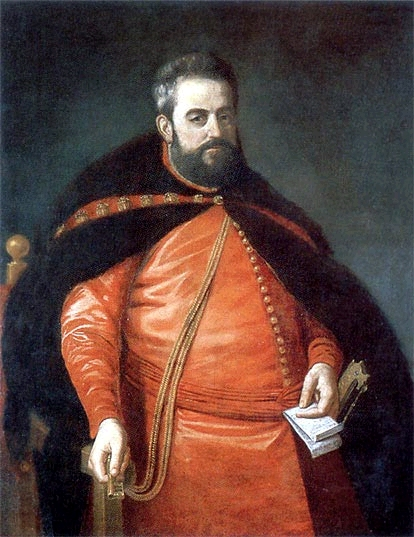
Adam Kazanowski (1599–1649)

== See also ==
- Ciepielów, Masovian Voivodeship
- Kazanowski Palace

== Bibliography ==
- Polski Słownik Biograficzny, tom XII, Kraków-Wrocław 1966-1967
- Stanisław Szenic, Pitawal warszawski, tom I, Warszawa 1957
- Zygmunt Gloger, Geografia historyczna ziem dawnej Polski, wyd. 1903 r.
- S. Orgelbranda Encyklopedia Powszechna (1898)
- Seweryn Uruski Herbarz szlachty polskiej
- Kasper Niesiecki Korona polska przy złotey wolności starożytnemi [...] kleynotami [...] ozdobiona [...] podana. T. 2, [D-K]
- Adam Boniecki Herbarz polski T. 13
