= Kazanowski =

Kazanowski is a Polish-language occupational surname, which means 'cauldron maker' or 'furnace worker', from the Slavic word kazan, meaning 'kettle, boiler, furnace'. The name may refer to:

- Adam Kazanowski (1599–1649), Polish nobleman
- Aleksander Dominik Kazanowski (1605–1648), Polish nobleman
- Gerald Kazanowski (born 1960), Canadian basketball player
- Marcin Kazanowski (1563–1636), Polish nobleman
- Marianna Kazanowska (1643–1687), Polish noblewoman
- Zygmunt Kazanowski (1563–1634), Polish nobleman

== See also ==
- Kazanowski family
- Kazanowski Palace, Warsaw
