= Entre =

Entre or Entré may refer to:

- Entré (Matz Bladhs album), 2009
- Entre (Paulo César Baruk album) by Paulo César Baruk, 2013
- Entre (Japanese: アントレ Antore), character type in the 2011 Japanese anime C (TV series)

== See also ==
- Entrée (disambiguation)
