= Katarzyna Tomicka =

Polish noblewoman (c. 1517–1551)

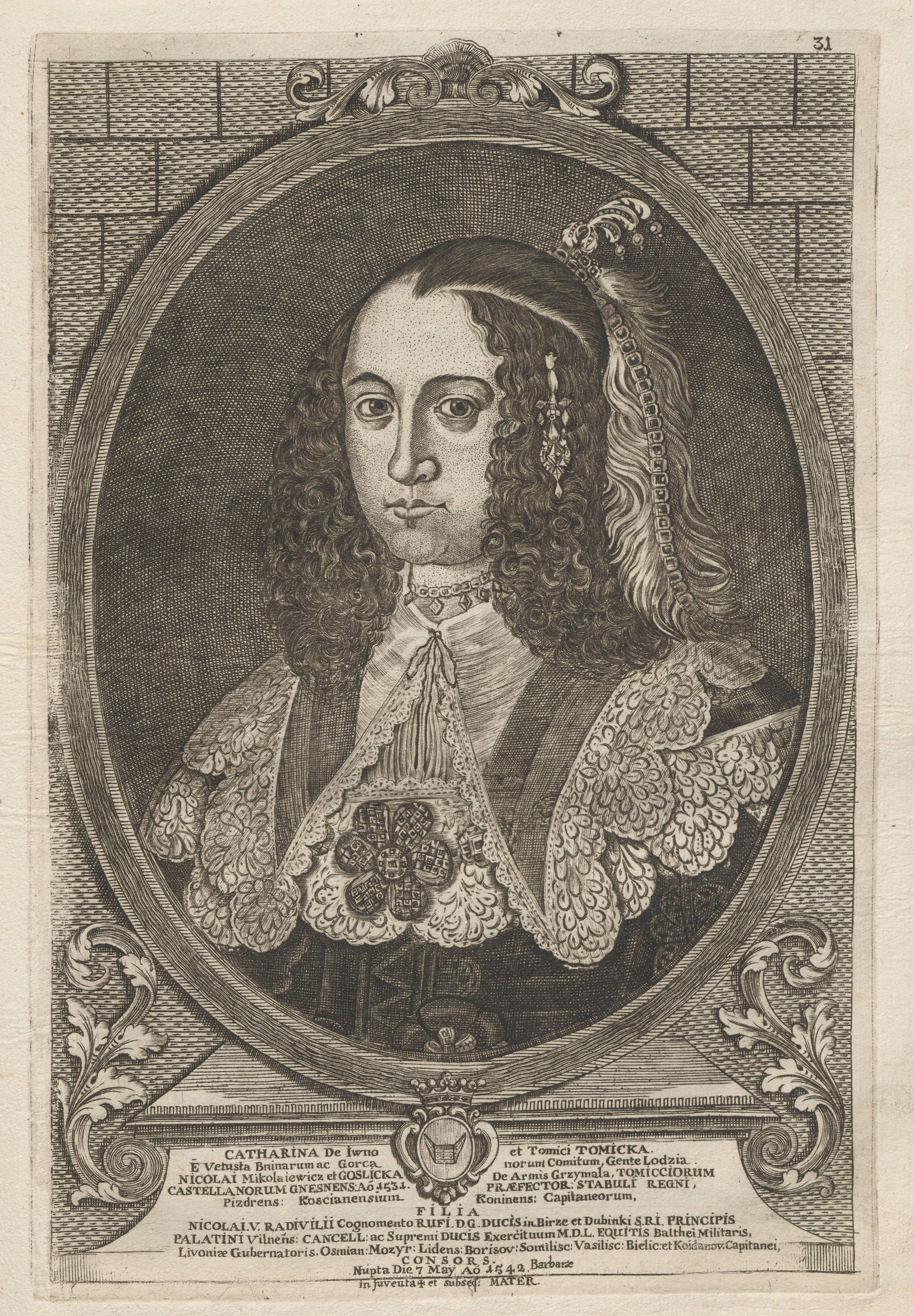
- Coat of arms: Łodzia
- Born: c. 1510
- Died: 1557
- Family: Tomicki
- Consort: Mikołaj Radziwiłł the Red
- Issue: Mikołaj VII Radziwiłł; Krzysztof "Piorun" Radziwiłł; Barbara Radziwiłł
- Father: Jan Tomicki h. Łodzia
- Mother: Barbara Potulicka h. Grzymała

Katarzyna Tomicka (c. 1510 – 1557) was a Polish noblewoman, known as the opponent of her sister-in-law queen Barbara Radziwiłł.

Katarzyna was born around 1510 in an unknown location, the third daughter of podkomorzy of Kalisz, Jan Tomicki h. Łodzia and sister-aunt of the Court Marshal and Bishop of Kraków, Piotr Tomicki h. Łodzia. She died in 1557; it is not known exactly where she died.

Her sons initiated the so-called "Calvinist lineage" of the Radziwiłł family. The male line expired in 1669.

== Marriage and issue ==
Katarzyna married Mikołaj Radziwiłł the Red around 1542 and had three children:

- Mikołaj VII Radziwiłł, married Aleksandra Wiśniowiecka h. Korybut and later Zofia Helena Hlebowicz Połońska h. Leliwa
- Krzysztof "Piorun" Radziwiłł was married to Katarzyna Sobek z Sulejówka h. Brochowicz, Princess Katarzyna Ostrogska, Katarzyna Tęczyńska h. Tópor and Princess Elizaveta Ostrogska
- NN

== Bibliography ==
- Besala J., Barbara Radziwiłłówna i Zygmunt August, Świat Książki, Warszawa 2007, ISBN 978-83-7391-715-6, pp. 138, 142.
- Boniecki A., Poczet rodów w Wielkiém Księstwie Litewskiém w XV i XVI wieku, Warszawa 1887, p. 279 (e-biblioteka Uniwersytetu Warszawskiego).
