= Mikołaj VII Radziwiłł =

Polish–Lithuanian noble (1546–1589)

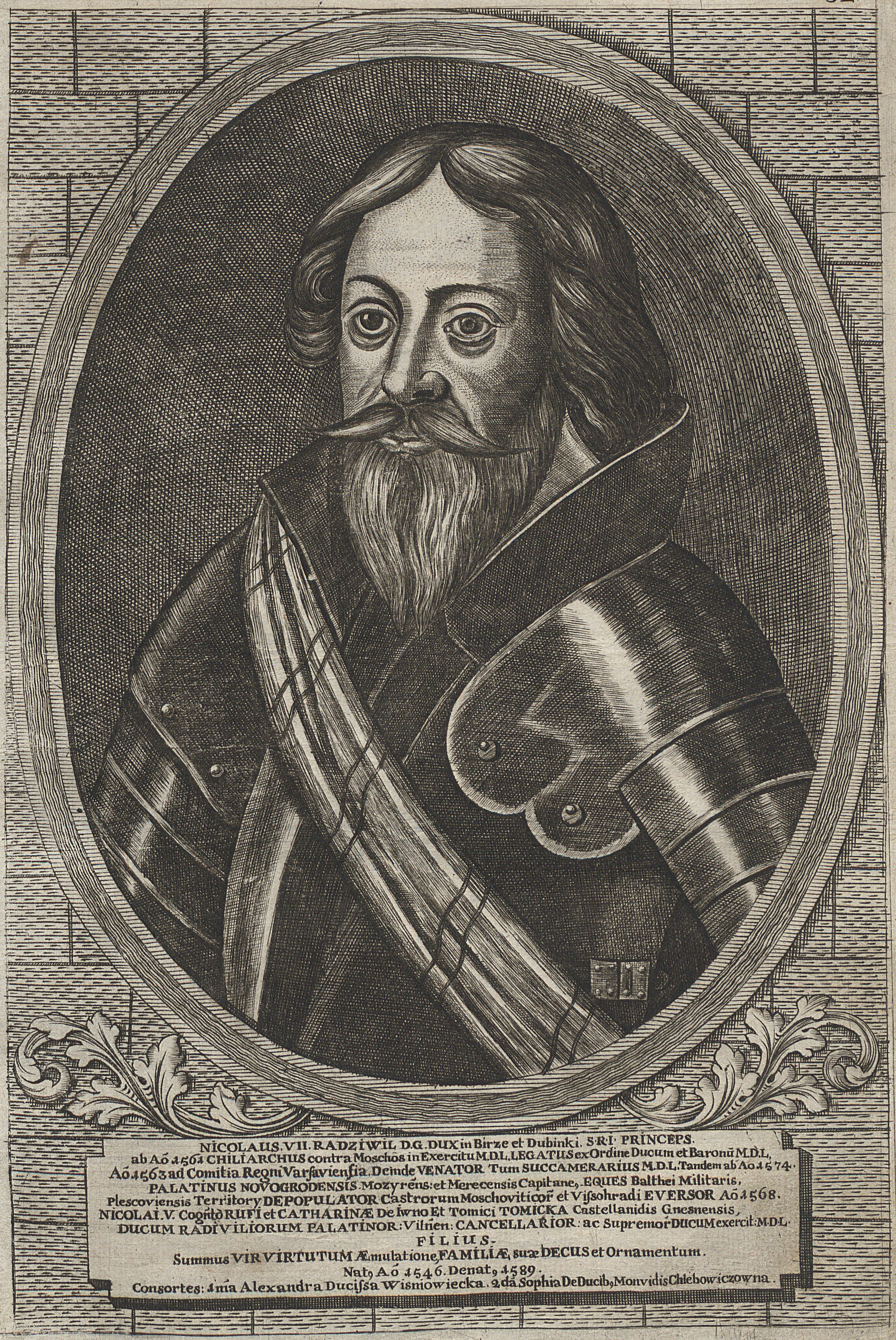
- Born: 1546
- Died: 1589 (aged 42–43)
- Spouses: Aleksandra Wiśniowiecka; Zofia Helena Hlebowicz Połońska
- Issue: Katarzyna Radziwiłł; Jerzy Radziwiłł with Zofia Helena Hlebowicz Połońska: Zofia Radziwiłł Dorohostajska
- Father: Mikołaj Radziwiłł the Red
- Mother: Katarzyna Tomicka

Mikołaj VII Radziwiłł, Lithuanian: Mykalojus Radvila also known as Mikołaj Radziwiłł The Seventh (1546–1589) was Reichsfürst of the Holy Roman Empire and a Polish–Lithuanian noble (szlachcic), Great Chamberlain of Lithuania in the Grand Duchy of Lithuania and later in Polish–Lithuanian Commonwealth. Voivode of Nowogródek Voivodeship, starost mozyryski and merecki. Member of the Radziwiłł family. He was a Calvinist.
