= Tomicki =

Tomicki (feminine: Tomicka) is a Polish-language surname. Notable people with the surname include:

- Bill Tomicki, American travel writer
- Piotr Tomicki (1464–1535), Polish Roman Catholic bishop
- Katarzyna Tomicka (c.1517–1551), Polish noblewoman, known as the sister-in-law and opponent of her sister-in-law queen Barbara Radziwiłł.
