= Leende dansmusik 2012 =

Studio album by Matz Bladhs
- Released: January 25, 2012
- Recorded: Studio Zilwerstar, Sweden
- Genre: dansband music
- Length: 48 minutes
- Label: EMI Music Sweden
- Producer: Magnus Persson

Matz Bladhs chronology
Entré (2009)	Leende dansmusik 2012 (2012)	Leende dansmusik 2013 (2013)

Leende dansmusik 2012 is a 2012 Matz Bladhs studio album.

== Track listing ==
1. Som rosor i regn (Carl Lösnitz, Calle Kindbom)
2. Säg att du vill (Thomas Berglund, Ulf Georgsson, Peter Samuelsson)
3. Jag kommer hem (Stefan Brunzell, Ulf Georgsson)
4. Klappar ditt hjärta bara för mig (Hans Rytterström)
5. En liten femöres kola (Alf Robertson)
6. Den gamla Moraklockan (Åke Fagerlund)
7. Himlens änglar gråter (Stefan Brunzell, Thomas G:son)
8. Minns du Maria (Schwartze Madonna) (Henry Mayer, Berle Günther, Hasse Carlsson)
9. Vår egen bröllopsdag (Mats Björklund, Elisabeth Lord, Harald Steinhauer)
10. När kärleken slår till (Hans Backström, Peter Bergqvist, Per-Arne Thigerberg)
11. Finns det nån annan (Stefan Brunzell, Ulf Georgsson, Tony Johansson)
12. 60's medley
13. Hur kan solen lysa (Thomas Berglund, Agneta Mårtensson)
14. Ge oss år tillbaka (Marianne Carlsson)

== Charts ==
Chart (2012)	Peak position
Sweden (Sverigetopplistan)	9
