= Leende dansmusik 2013 =

Studio album by Matz Bladhs
- Released: February 27, 2013
- Recorded: Studio Zilwerstar, Sweden
- Genre: dansband music
- Length: 51 minutes
- Label: EMI Music Sweden
- Producer: Magnus Persson

Matz Bladhs chronology
Leende dansmusik 2012 (2012)	Leende dansmusik 2013 (2013)

Leende dansmusik 2013 is a 2013 Matz Bladhs studio album.

== Track listing ==
1. Tänker du på mig i ensamhet (Stefan Brunzell, Ulf Georgsson)
2. En bit av himlen (Thomas G:son)
3. Det du gör med mig (Thomas Berglund, Thomas Persson, Ulf Georgsson)
4. Det sägs att kärleken är evig (Magnus Ekwall, Lennart Dahlberg)
5. Hold Me (Johnny Thunqvist, Kaj Svenling, Torben Eschen)
6. Diggety Doggety (William Erman)
7. Halvvägs till himlen (Thomas G:son, Henrik Sethsson)
8. När du ser på mig (Billy Heil)
9. Mitt lilla krypin (Paul Sahlin)
10. Ingen större hemlighet (Thomas Berglund, Ulf Georgsson, Henrik Sethsson)
11. Har jag sagt till dig idag (Hasse Andersson)
12. Vi har så mycket att säga varandra (Jules Sylvain, Åke Söderblom)
13. Inte vet jag (Dick Karlsson, Ulf Börjesson)
14. You Raise Me Up (Rolf Løvland)
15. Jag vill bara va en gammal man (Mikael Wiehe)

== Charts ==
Chart (2013)	Peak position
Sweden (Sverigetopplistan)	9
