= Treaty of Naples (1639) =

1639 treaty between Spain and Poland

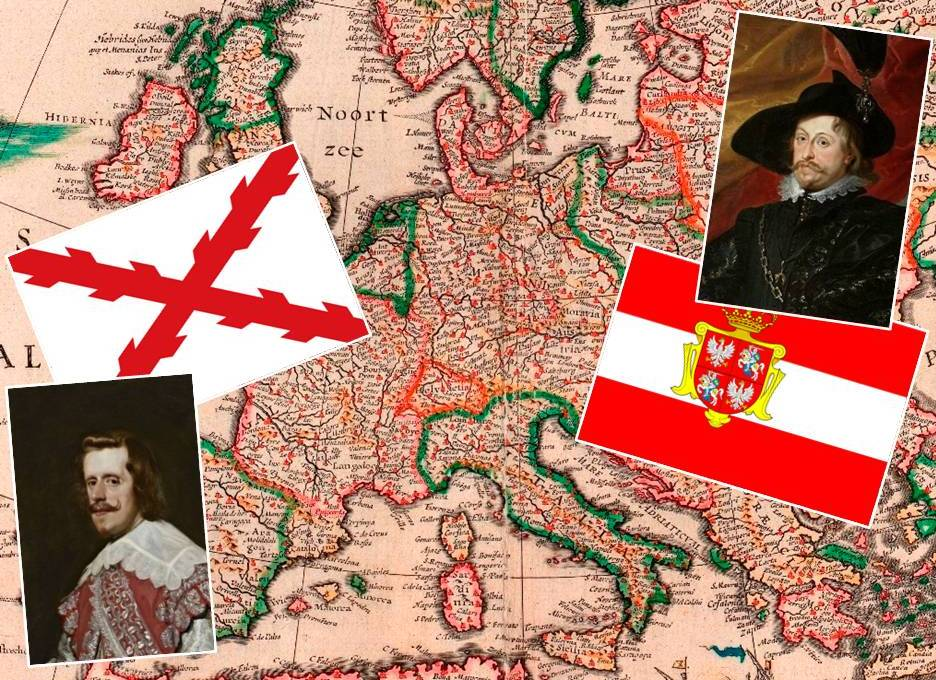

Treaty of Naples (Polish: traktat neapolitański, Lithuanian: Neapolio sutartis, Latin: Foedus Neapolitanum, Spanish: Tratado de Nápoles, Italian: Trattato di Napoli) was a political-military agreement between the Kingdom of Spain and the Kingdom of Poland, signed in Naples in late 1639. The Polish king Władysław IV agreed to raise an army of 17,000 men, which would consist of 12,000 cavalry and 5,000 infantry. Following transit across the imperial territory, the troops were to be employed under Spanish command in Flanders against the French. The Spanish king Felipe IV, apart from covering recruitment and maintenance cost, was to pay the Polish monarch 500,000 Neapolitan escudos. The Poles almost immediately demanded re-negotiation of the treaty, which resulted in another agreement being concluded in 1641; the Spaniards were to pay more for an even smaller army. This treaty was not implemented either, and the Madrid court cancelled the deal in early 1642. The treaty remains the only bilateral Spanish-Polish military alliance agreement ever concluded between the two countries.

== Spain and Poland until mid-1630s ==
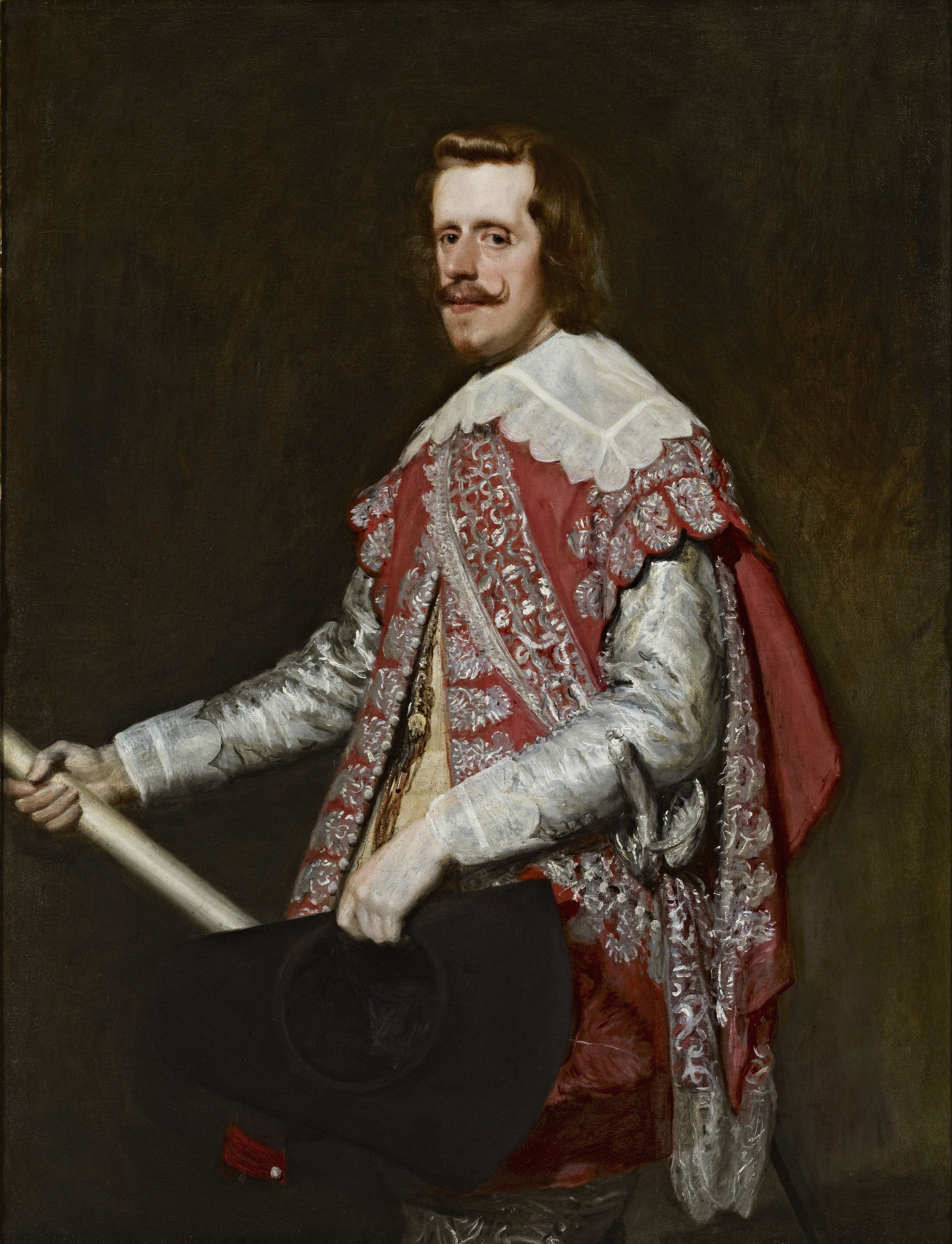
Felipe IV by Velasquez

Until the early modern period, relations between Spain and Poland were close to non-existent. Politically the two countries operated in entirely different zones; the former focused on the Iberian Peninsula, western/central Mediterranean and northern slopes of the Pyrenees, the latter concentrated on the Baltic and huge plains in the Oder-Vistula-Dnieper basins. However, in the 16th century both states emerged as continental powers and their geographical interests became more closely aligned. The first major political encounter turned out to be a conflict; the crowns of Spain and Poland claimed the south-Italian heritage of Bona Sforza, the late queen-consort of Poland. In the late 16th century both courts started to maintain diplomatic representatives in each other's capitals, and politicians began to consider would-be opportunities related. First major attempts to achieve some synergy occurred in early phases of the Thirty Years' War. In the mid-1620s Felipe IV of Spain intended to crack down on Dutch merchant shipping on northern routes, while Sigismund III of Poland, himself of Swedish origin, had his eyes set on regaining the throne in Stockholm. Diplomatic services of both monarchs worked to build a navy, possibly financed by the Spaniards and manned by the Poles, which would seize control over the western Baltic. However, interests of both kingdoms were not exactly the same; moreover, the emperor and his allies pursued their own goals. The result was that a joint fleet was captured by the Swedes in 1631. In 1632 Spain withdrew from active Baltic policy, and the Polish–Lithuanian Commonwealth Navy was dismantled as well.

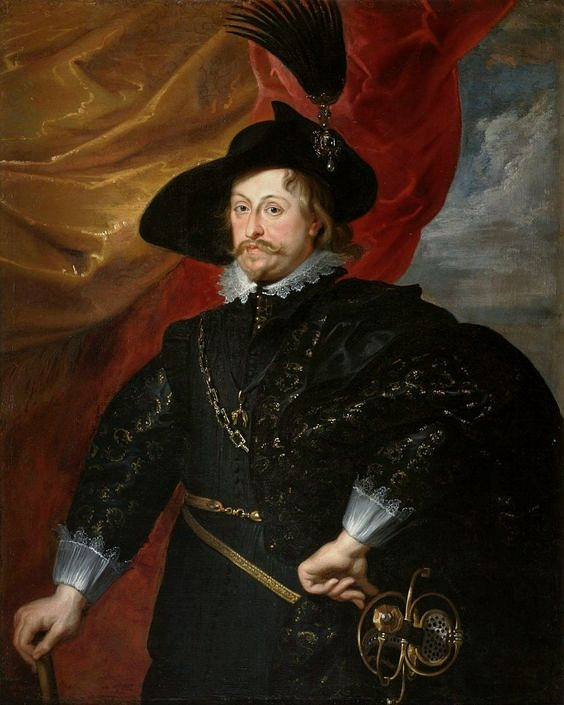
Władysław IV by Rubens

The new Polish king Władysław IV, crowned in 1632, resumed the plans harbored by his father. In 1634 he sent a special envoy to Madrid. Apart from usual negotiations on the Sforza heritage, the talks focused on compensation for the Polish fleet lost to the Swedes when nominally at the service of Felipe IV and ensuring Spanish posts and pension for two royal brothers. The main point, however, was Spanish financial support for future Polish military effort against Sweden, since 1630 the formal belligerent in the Thirty Years' War. The Polish-Swedish 1629 Altmark truce was to expire in 1635 and the Polish monarch was considering renewal of the conflict. In 1634 Władysław sent another envoy, and in 1635 another one followed. Until that time Madrid adopted an ambiguous stand; the Spaniards politely listened to Polish demands, but there were no tangible results. This changed in the spring of 1635, when two envoys were agreed to travel to Warsaw. However, they did not realize the urgency. French envoys, sent from Paris at approximately the same time but with opposite objectives, travelled by sea and arrived in Poland in May 1635 just in time to secure prolongation of the Altmark truce in Stuhmsdorf. The Spaniards travelled by land and with many detours; they reached the king (who at the time acted as the Grand Duke of Lithuania) in Vilnius in August 1636. It was there that they first proposed that an army be raised in Poland to join the fighting in ranks of the Catholic League.

== Vasas, Habsburgs and the French (1637–1639) ==
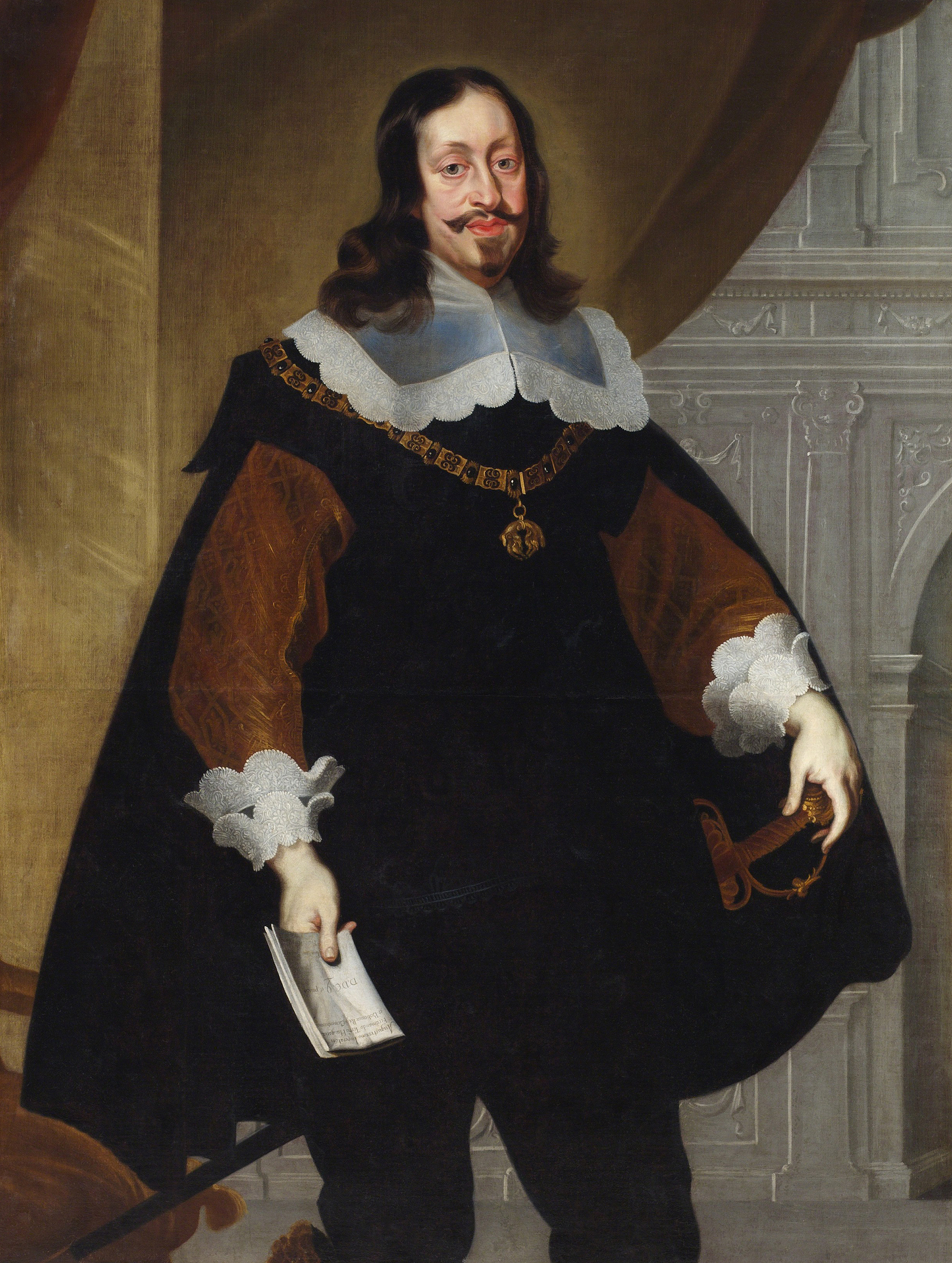
Ferdinand III

The year of 1637 produced what seemed like an emerging alliance between the Habsburgs and the Polish Vasas. Madrid granted pension to two royal brothers and conferred upon prince John Casimir the Toisón d’Or order. Before leaving Warsaw the Spanish envoy Vázquez de Miranda has also agreed to pay compensation for the fleet lost in Wismar and interests on Sforza's heritage, though there was no tangible result when it comes to a job for the Polish prince; only vague concepts about his role in command of the Mediterranean fleet or an army in Flanders were floated. The major step, however, was related to the emperor. The Vienna Habsburgs and the Warsaw Vasas agreed on a so-called Family Pact. Władysław IV and the emperor Ferdinand III were cousins, as mother of the Polish king was sister to emperor Ferdinand II. However, in line with the pact they became also brothers-in-law, as Władysław IV was agreed to marry Cecilia Renata of Austria, the sister of Ferdinand III. Though the agreement sealed some heritage and succession issues and did not cover military co-operation, it seemed that following years of indecision, the king of Poland was firmly leaning towards Vienna instead of Paris.

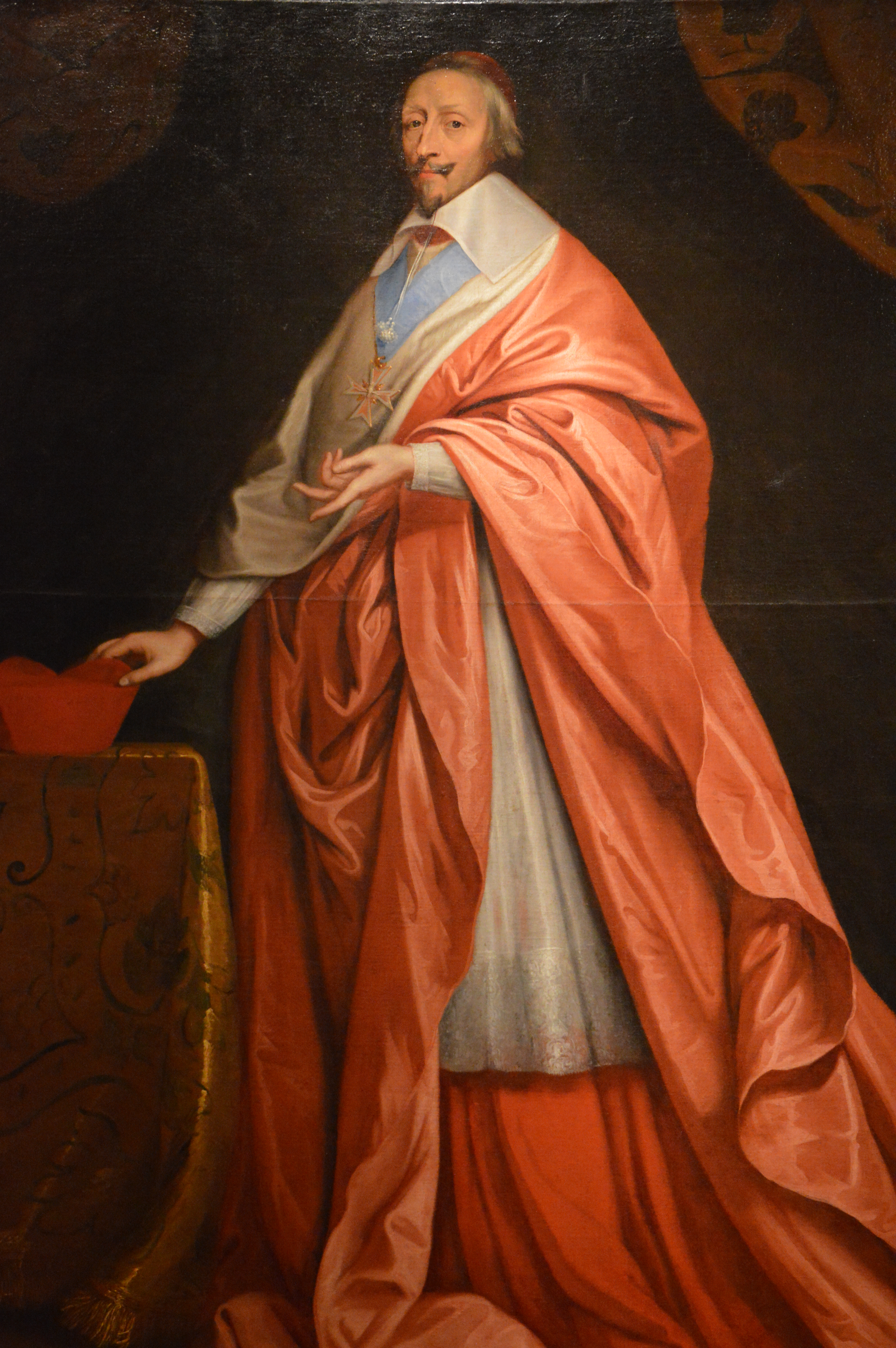
Cardinal Richelieu

In early 1638 prince John Casimir left Poland for Spain; it is not entirely clear whether Madrid and Warsaw had agreed on his future role on the Iberian Peninsula or whether he travelled to speed negotiations up. During his stay in Vienna the Paris press broke the news on his future appointment as viceroy of Portugal; Spanish sources suggest it was merely an option, considered at Consejo de Estado. However, in May the French detained the prince in Port-de-Bouc, as he was travelling from Italy to Spain along the Mediterranean coast. Officially he was charged with espionage, but scholars speculate that cardinal Richelieu seized the opportunity to dissuade Władysław IV from military alliance with the Habsburgs and from entering the Thirty Years' War. During the summer it turned out that the royal brother would not be freed any time soon. In October 1638 Władysław met Ferdinand III in Nikolsburg to agree further action; both monarchs decided to seek mediation of Italian states, usually on good terms with the king of France. A Tuscan citizen in service of the Polish king, Francisco de Bivoni, was sent to the Apennine Peninsula. In late 1638 he held talks in Republic of Venice and in early 1639 he was in Republic of Genoa, in both cases assisted by the Spanish diplomacy. He was also empowered to represent the Polish king in the Duchy of Parma; he might have been there in the early spring of 1639. All these efforts proved fruitless; Richelieu did not change his stand and John Casimir remained in the French custody for already a year.

== Madrid and Warsaw decide to enter military talks (1639) ==
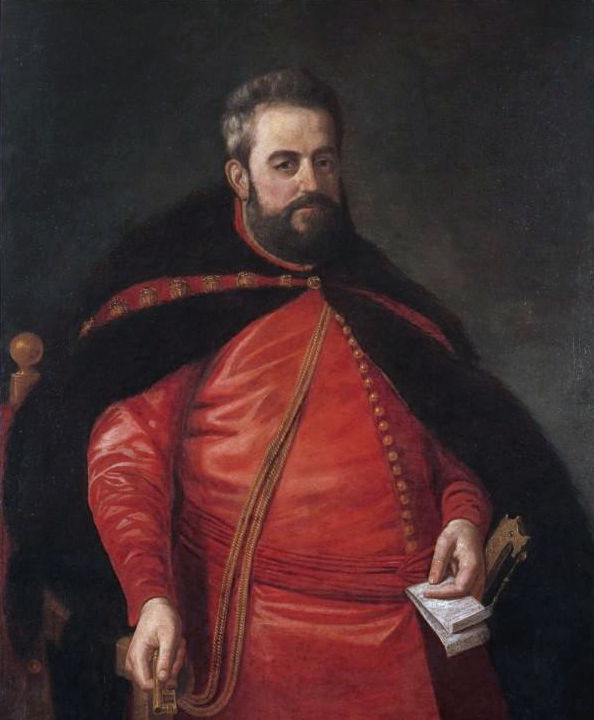
Kazanowski by Danckers

While the Poles sought a peaceful way to free the prince, the Spaniards were pondering upon seizing the opportunity and as suggested back in 1636, they renewed the concept of getting the Poles engaged militarily against the French, possibly in Flanders. Felipe IV sent to Warsaw another envoy; it was Fernando de Monroy, nephew of the Spanish ambassador in Vienna marqués de Castañeda and already resident in the Austrian capital. He arrived in Warsaw in the spring of 1639 and found Władysław IV not only upset with the French and frustrated with futile Italian mediation, but also adopting an increasingly belligerent attitude. Details of Monroy's talks in Poland are not known and it is not clear who he spoke to, yet the key of his partners was Adam Kazanowski, personal friend of the king and high official at the court. When discussing raising of the army to engage along the Habsburgs he identified 3 options possible: that the Polish diet approves of the plan and the king leads the troops himself, that the diet rejects the plan and a royal brother leads the troops under the Vasa standard, and that in case John Casimir is freed from French custody, troops are raised and sent under the Habsburg colors.

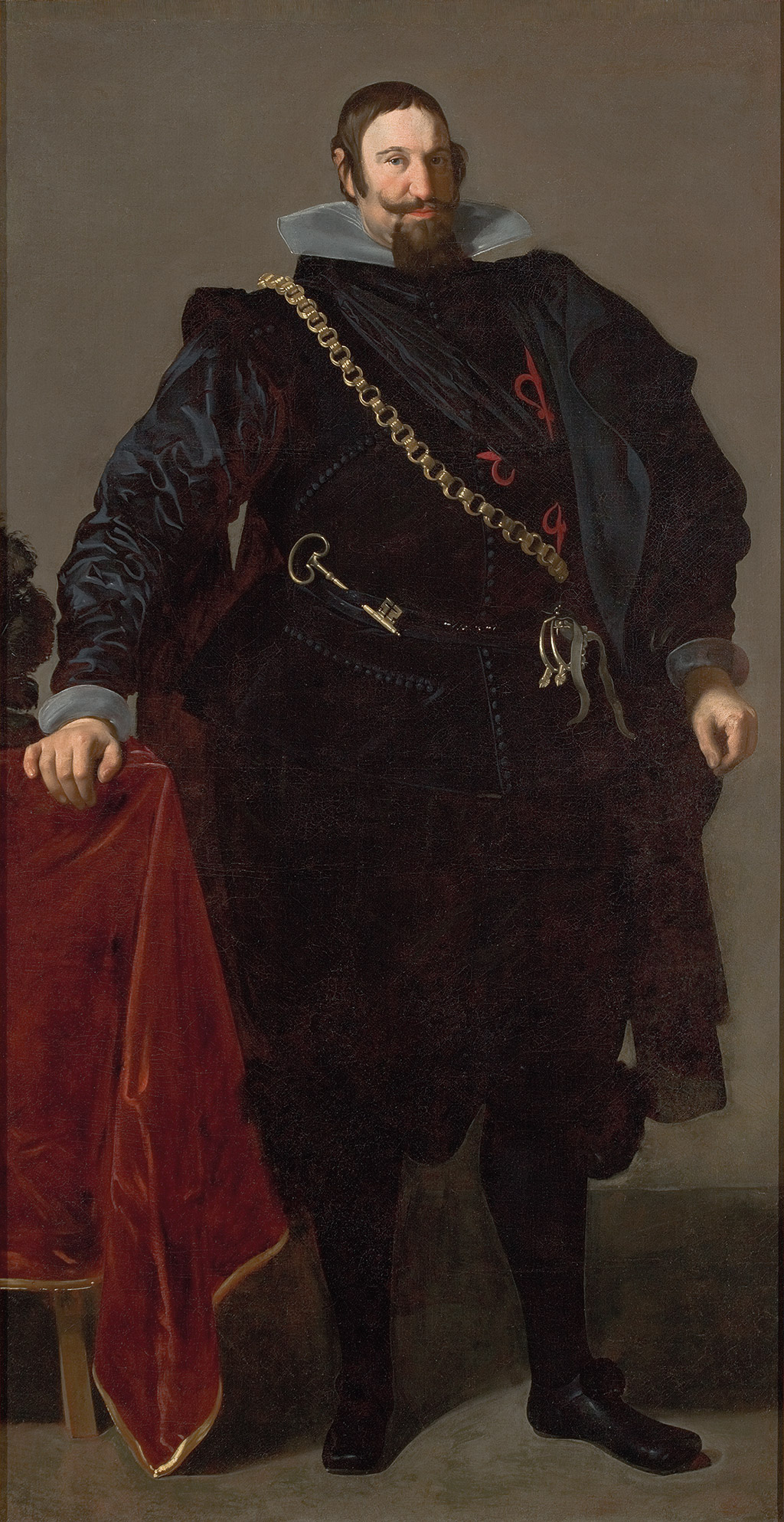
Olivares by Velasquez

During or shortly after Monroy's mission the Polish king decided to explore the path proposed by Madrid and to start talks on military co-operation, potentially aimed against the French. Some time in mid-1639 Bivoni, still on the Apennine Peninsula, had his powers extended accordingly and he moved further south. In August he was already in the Kingdom of Naples; he engaged in negotiations with duque de Medina de las Torres, the viceroy of Naples. In the fall of 1639 the issue was repeatedly discussed at Consejo de Estado in Madrid. Though there were different views, final decision was with Olivares, the prime minister and key decision maker. His opinion prevailed and the Council agreed to proceed; Medina de las Torres was empowered the handle the negotiations. It is not exactly clear why Naples and Medina have been chosen; Vienna would have been closer and the Spanish diplomatic team there, especially marqués de Castañeda, were better acquainted with details of East European policy. Scholars speculate that at the time the Kingdom of Naples turned into sort of a logistics base and reserve economic pool for Madrid, and Medina was well experienced in handling related financial issues. It might have been that Felipe IV intended to negotiate away from the watchful eye of the imperial Habsburg diplomacy. Then, the Polish envoy was already on the Apennine Peninsula. Last but not least, southern Italy was located sort of half-way between Madrid and Warsaw and since Sforza's death the area was of mutual interest to both kings.

== Spanish and Polish objectives ==
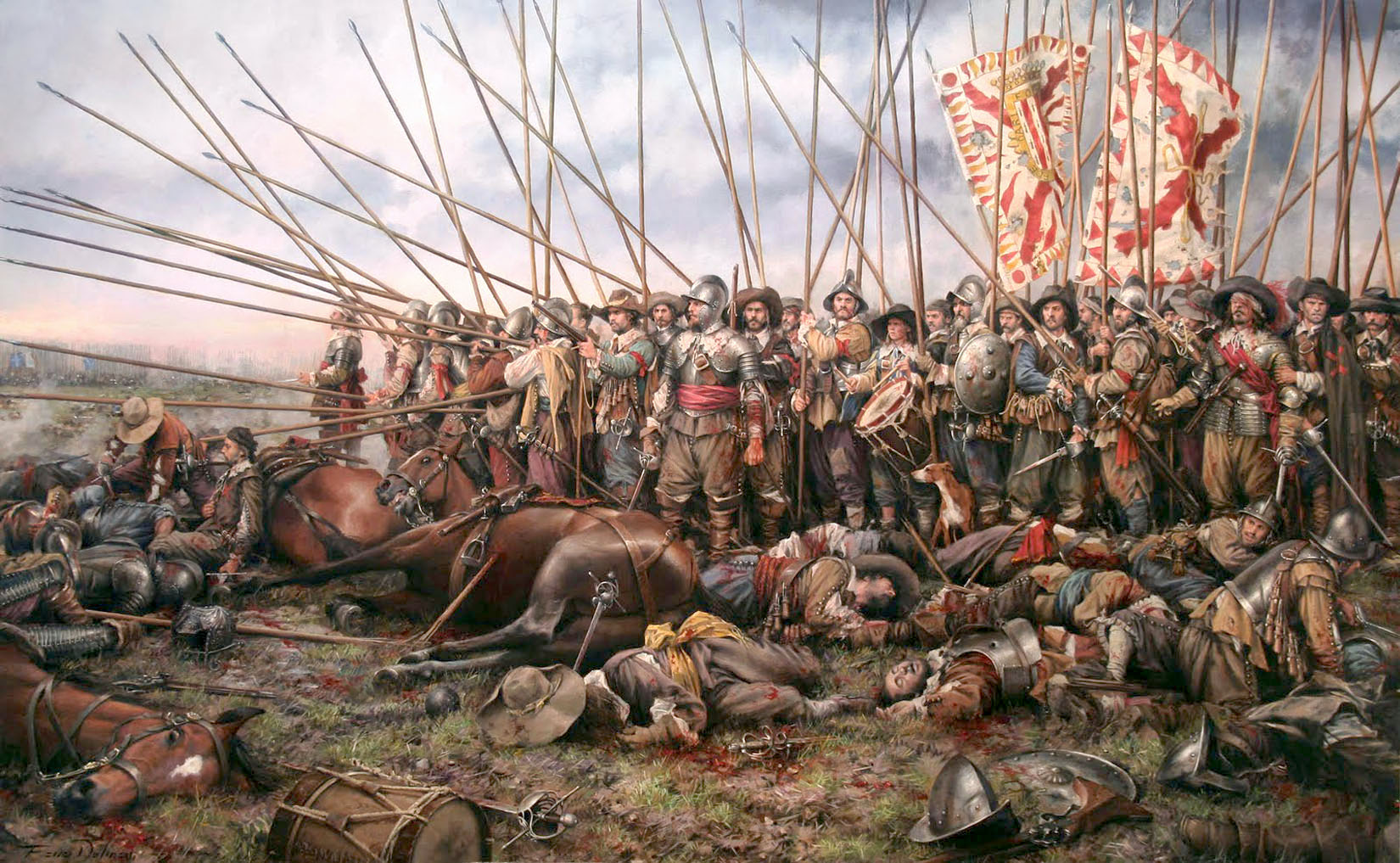
Spanish infantry during Thirty Years' War

In 1637–1638 the Habsburgs recorded a string of defeats, including rupture of Camino Español. Their forces were overstretched and capable of defensive action only. Scholars note also that since the mid-1630s the military resources of Madrid and Vienna were running out. Apart from already exploited core recruitment areas also reserve territories were hardly in position to raise new troops; some recruits were delivered to frontline units in chains. Minor groups related to Eastern Europe have already been engaged, e.g. a Scotsman formerly in the Polish service, experienced during Muscovite campaigns, later commanded a unit partially composed of his equally experienced compatriots in Flanders. There were attempts to recruit in Denmark, Hamburg, Bavaria and Tirol. The army branch affected in particular was the cavalry. At the same time, Polish mounted units gained recognition in Europe. However, they were also doubts lingering. Some viewed them as brutal and hard to control; the Elector of Saxony claimed that cossack mercenaries in Polish service were “harmful people that do as much damage to enemies as to friends”. Some Spaniards thought that Poland was too far to make any co-operation reliable; however, Felipe IV seemed well disposed and noted that cossacks were “unique when it comes to making breakthroughs and crossing mountains”. Initially the Spanish thought about engaging Polish troops against the Swedes in northern Germany, but given the Polish-Swedish armistice was in force they then switched to the idea of a Polish army fighting the French in Flanders.

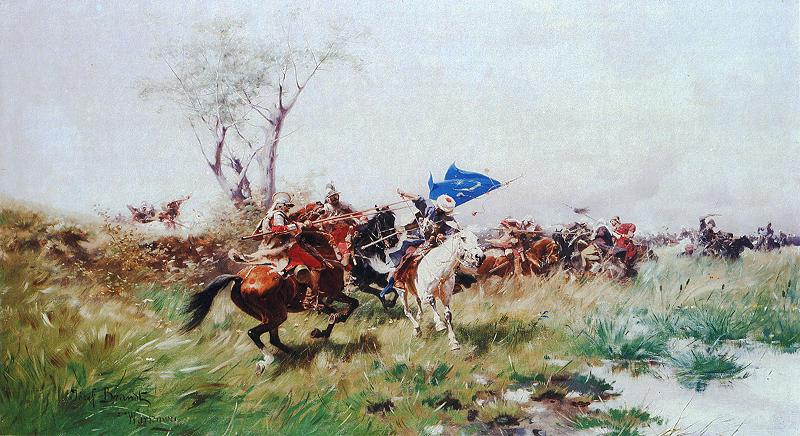
Polish cavalry during wars with Turkey

The Polish objectives are far less clear. Following wars against Sweden, Turkey and Russia, since 1634 the country was enjoying the period of peace; it was much appreciated by nobility, which bore the brunt of all military effort. They had little understanding for Swedish dynastic objectives of their Vasa king, and even less so given it would result in Polish entry in the Thirty Years' War. Neither Władysław IV was eager to join the European bloodshed. He might have considered minor engagement if this would enhance his position against the competitive Vasa branch ruling in Sweden, but he was generally unwilling to commit himself either to the Spanish-Austrian alliance or to the French; his strategy consisted of leaving all options open. Detention of his brother John Casimir pushed him towards opening military negotiations with Felipe IV. However, it is not clear whether he genuinely considered a Polish army to be engaged against the French, or whether from the onset he approached his talks with the Spaniards merely as a diplomatic means against Paris, and was never willing to close a deal with Madrid. Another possible option was that objectives of Władysław IV were purely financial, and that dependent upon the diet when it comes to raising money internally, he intended to extract cash from the Madrid court.

== Treaty of Naples (1639) ==
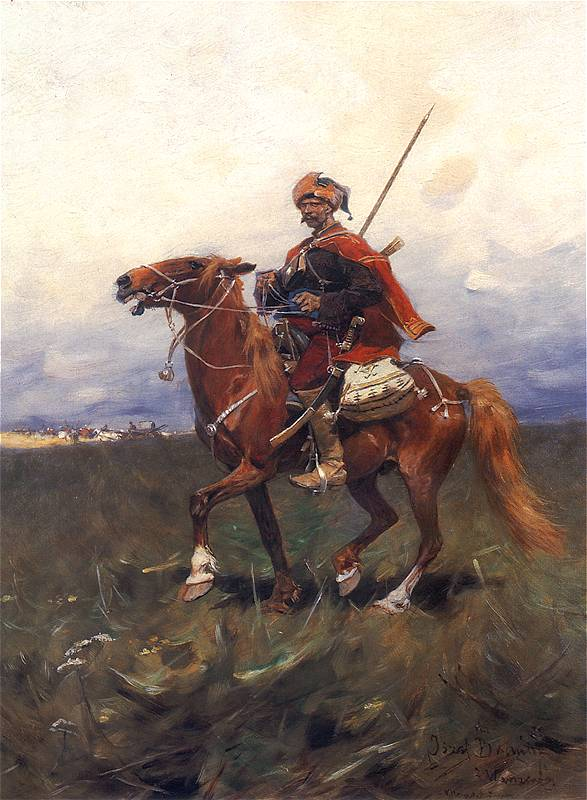
Cossack in Polish service by Brandt

Negotiations were held in Naples by Bivoni on behalf of Władysław IV and by Medina de las Torres in name of Felipe IV; other personalities were also involved, like the Polish internuncio in Naples. It is known that the two started talking already in August 1639; however, Medina was fully empowered by Consejo de Estado no earlier than in November 1639. It is not clear when both negotiators arrived at an agreement; one scholar claims the talks were closed by the year-end but provides no date. Exact format of the compromise is not known though it was formalized on paper and signed; neither the original nor a copy has been found in Spanish or Polish archives, and its contents are referred after later correspondence. However, scholars refer firmly to “Tratado de Nápoles”, “traktat sojuszniczy” or “układ neapolitański”.

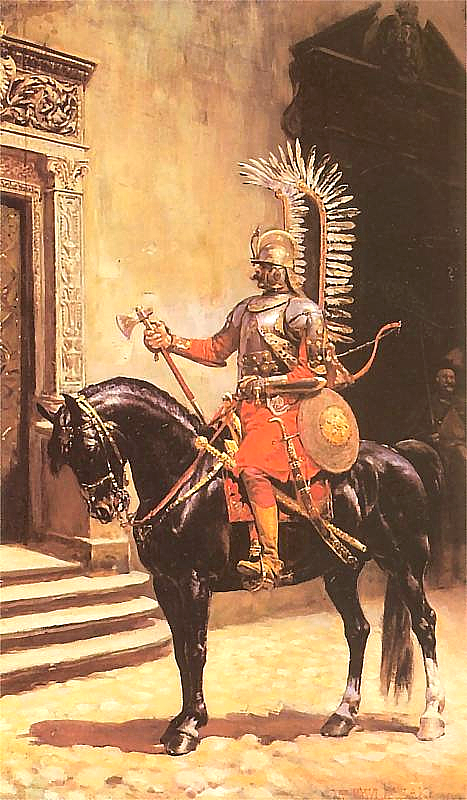
Winged hussar by Pawliszak

The treaty envisioned raising an army in Poland. The force was to be formed by 12,000 cavalry and 5,000 infantry. They were to be accompanied by usual support and logistics units, not intended for combat, though estimates of strength of the entire army differ between 22,000 and almost 60,000 men. They were to be commanded by Polish officers and appear officially as the army at the service of the Polish king. The troops were to be transported by land from Poland to Flanders; details were not specified. Once there, the troops would join the army commanded by Cardenal Infante and engage in combat against the French, which would technically put Poland on wartime footing against France. It was agreed the Poland would neither conclude a separatist peace with France nor return any seized territory to the French without prior agreement with the Spaniards. In return, viceroy of Naples in name of Felipe IV was to pay the Polish king 500,000 Neapolitan escudos.

It was also agreed – though it is not clear whether appropriate stipulations were included in the treaty itself – that on the Spanish side execution of treaty would be co-ordinated by 3 individuals. The financials were entrusted to Medina de las Torres, to be handled by infrastructure controlled by the Kingdom of Naples. The embassy in Vienna, headed by marqués de Castañeda, was supposed to negotiate the passage of Polish troops across the empire and manage relations with the Vienna court. Finally, an Italian in Spanish diplomatic service, a certain Allegretto de Allegretti, who for some time has been serving as a link between the Vienna embassy and Warsaw, was to supervise recruitment and organization of the troops in Poland. The army was supposed to be ready by late spring of 1640 and to cross the empire during the summer, to pass under the Spanish command later. Though the Vienna diplomacy was informed about the developments, they were not consulted on specific issues and did not participate in the negotiations.

== Implementation of the treaty (1640) ==
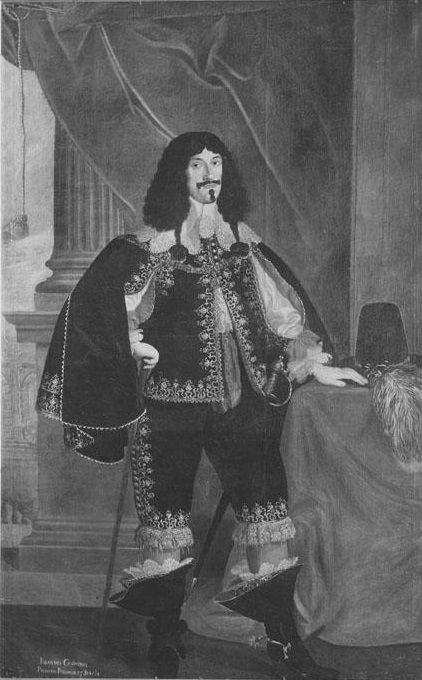
John Casimir of Poland

In early 1640 Medina transferred 430,000 ducats to Castañeda in Vienna for further processing and in March he notified Madrid that the first installment had been paid. At the time Allegretti was already in Warsaw and reported problems. King Władysław IV pointed to procedural issues which allegedly made ratification of the treaty unfeasible. In the spring a Polish mission in Paris secured liberation of Jan Kazimierz following 2 years in custody; in return, the Vasas pledged not to engage militarily against the French. Some scholars believe that liberation of the prince was immediate result of the Naples talks, which by the time were already no secret, though this remains disputable speculation only. In line with earlier agreement the Spaniards expected that works on implementation of the Treaty of Naples go on, and Bivoni ensured them that this was indeed the case. However, there was no visible progress in terms of actual recruitment.

In late spring Madrid decided to send to Poland a military who would professionally assess the state of affairs; the person chosen was Pedro Roco de Villagutiérrez, cavalry captain at the service of Cardenal Infante in Flanders. He travelled from Regensburg and arrived in Warsaw in July 1640. Villagutiérrez was not entitled to any political talks; his task was to join forces with Allegretti to get the agreed deal done. Initially he worked with Kazanowski and his ally Kasper Denhoff to get the treaty published but he soon concluded that the Poles merely sought a point of deadlock that they could blame the Spaniards for. Himself he was profoundly skeptical about the entire deal and reported to Madrid that raising such a major force of mercenaries was militarily not very efficient. Moreover, Vienna declared that given recently suffered wartime destruction and plundering of imperial territory, they would not allow the Polish army to go through.

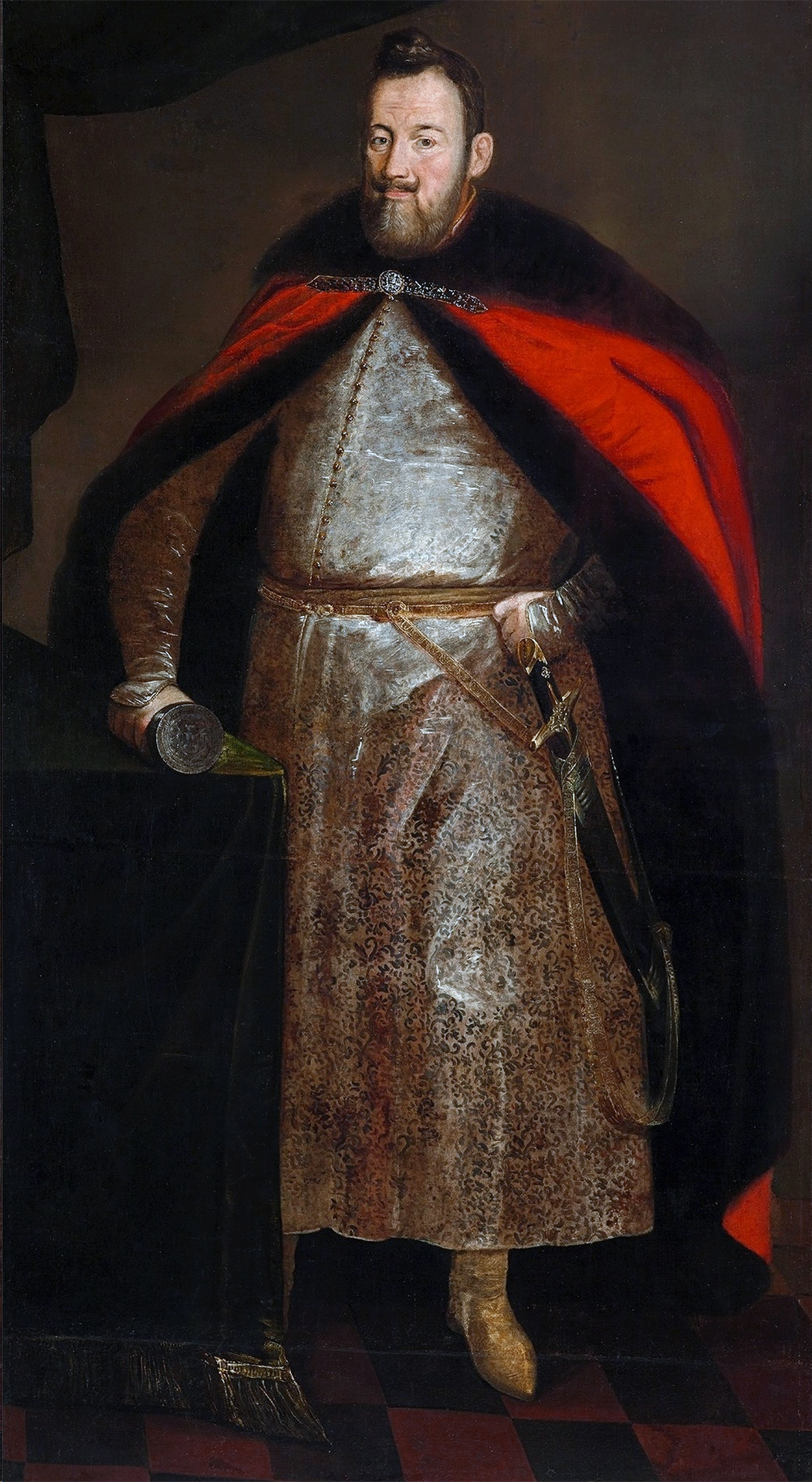
Jerzy Ossoliński

Given the stalemate, Bivoni and Monroy suggested payments to key Polish officials to get the deal executed; apart from Kazanowski the person identified as key decision-maker was Jerzy Ossoliński, an experienced statesman handling a number of diplomatic tasks. Though the Spaniards initially considered paying both Kazanowski and Ossoliński, they eventually decided to focus on the former; the sum intended for him (including the markup for Bivoni) was 20,000 thaler. However, this helped little. In mid-1640 Bivoni told Medina that in new circumstances, the deal had to be re-negotiated. The viceroy of Naples firmly opposed re-opening of closed agreement, but Madrid was in increasingly difficult position. Apart from a string of military defeats there was a rebellion in Catalonia and tension was running high in Portugal; Medina was instructed to talk. In the meantime, problems with implementation of the treaty led to two personal changes. Castañeda had to leave the Vienna embassy, charged by Medina with mishandling the issue. Bivoni – who according to hints of the Warsaw officials might have exceeded his powers – was also recalled; he was replaced by Maciej Tytlewski, who arrived in Naples in late 1640.

== New treaty (1641) ==
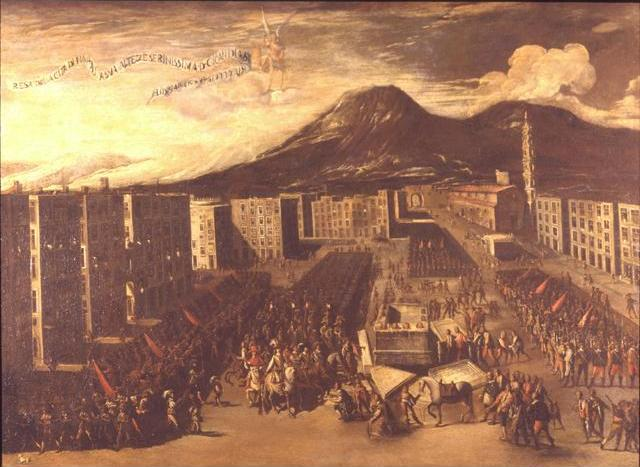
Naples in the mid-17th century

Renewed negotiations between Tytlewski and Medina took place in late 1640 and early 1641; they were concluded in February. Again, there is no formal document identified in the archives and it is not at all certain that such document has ever been signed. However, Spanish scholars refer formally to the agreement as “segundo Tratado de Nápoles” or – given final touches were added later in Warsaw – as “Tratado de Varsovia” and “acuerdo de Varsovia”; Polish scholars refer somewhat more vaguely to “kolejne porozumienie”.

The February 1641 agreement made a few important changes to the Treaty of Naples. The first was about reducing the army; troops to be raised numbered 13,000 combat-ready men. The force of 9,000 cavalry consisted of 3,000 heavy-weight lancers (identified by some scholars as winged hussars) and 6,000 light-weight cossacks; the infantry numbered 4,000 men. Including support and logistics rear, the army was again to be in the range of 20,000 to 40,000 people. The money to be paid by the Spaniards to the Polish royal treasury was 230,000 thaler plus 400,000 thaler in case Poland gets involved in war against Sweden, Russia or Turkey, which effectively doubled the cost agreed back in 1639. The force was to be raised not in name of the Polish king but in name of the emperor, and as such it was to pass under command of Cardenal Infante in Flanders. Finally, numerous details were added to specify issues such as command, transport and logistics, e.g. Medina successfully resisted the demand that the troops be entitled to plunder territories they pass through.

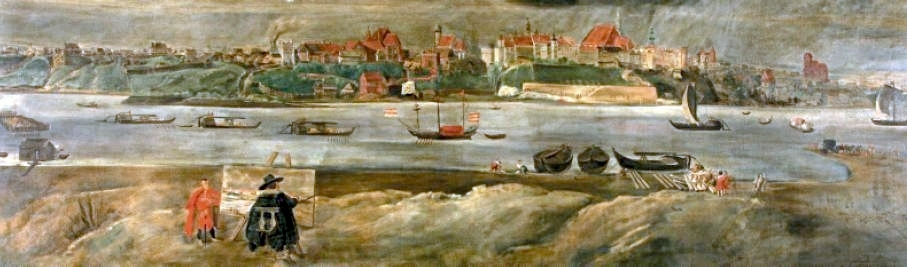
Warsaw in the mid-17th century

Scholars note that businesswise, the Polish king made an excellent deal. A winged hussar in regular Polish wartime service was paid annually 164 złoty; in emperor's service and under Spanish command he would cost 30 thaler monthly, equivalent to some 1,080 złoty annually. Similar differences were involved in case of a cossack (24 thaler monthly) and an infantryman (12 thaler monthly). All this came on top of one-off recruitment cost, also to be covered by the Spaniards: 40 thaler for a hussar, 30 thaler for a cossack and 16 thaler for an infantryman, and on top of the 230,000-thaler fee agreed as political cost of the deal, to be pocketed by the treasury of Władysław IV. Despite the higher cost and extra conditions attached, Medina seemed satisfied with the deal and he reported it to Felipe IV as a success. To avoid problems which followed the 1639 treaty – for which Medina blamed Castañeda and his envoy Allegretti – this time the viceroy of Naples sent his own representative to Warsaw to supervise the implementation. The person chosen was Vicenzo Tuttavilla, duca de Calabritto, a military man who later grew to high commander in the army of the Kingdom of Naples.

== Failed implementation proceedings (1641–1642) ==
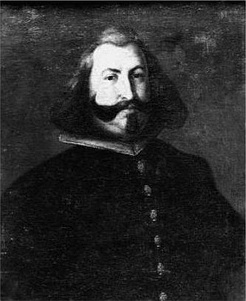
Medina de las Torres

When Tuttavilla arrived in Warsaw in the spring of 1641 he found himself engaged in diplomatic struggle against a team of French envoys, who worked to prevent the Vasa rapprochement with the Habsburgs and ensure Polish neutrality in the Thirty Years' War. He could have reported partial success, as Władysław IV refused to ratify the 1640 agreement with Richelieu, which pledged not to engage Polish troops against the French. However, there was little follow-up of the Naples agreement, either in terms of approval by the diet or in terms of actual recruitment. In June 1641 Tytlewski presented Medina with a letter from the Polish king. It included numerous demands presented as conditions of implementation: payment of interests on the Sforza heritage and appropriate arrangements for Ducado di Bari and Principato di Rossano, compensation for the Wismar fleet and nomination of John Casimir to virrey de Portugal. Moreover, Władysław IV asked that 400,000-thaler-fee, originally to be paid only in case Poland gets engaged in a war against Sweden, Russia or Turkey is paid unconditionally. Despite this blow, Medina still considered the deal negotiable and was principally concerned about the financials.

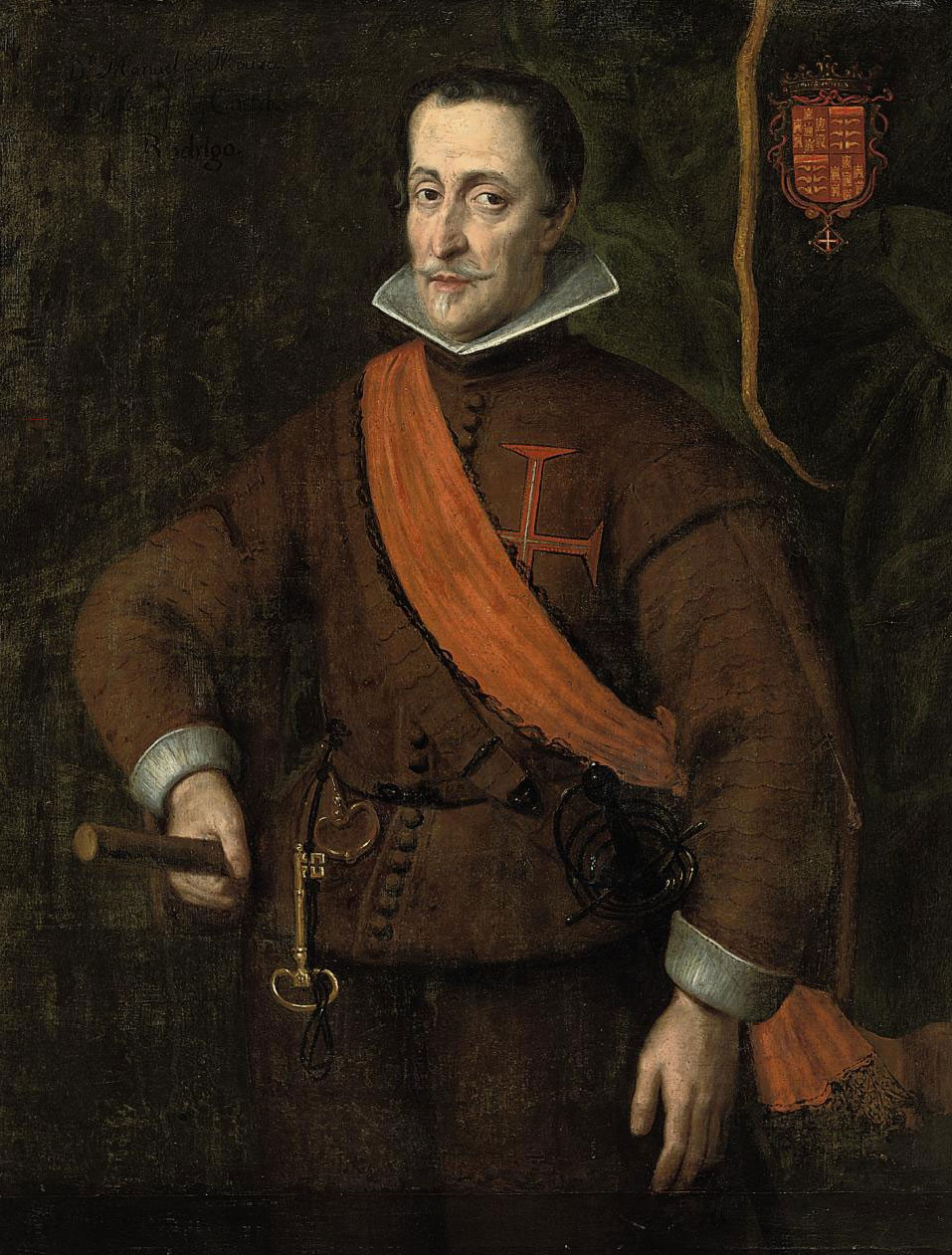
Marqués de Castelo Rodrigo

Kazanowski, who by the time has pocketed large sums from the Spaniards and was personally implicated in the deal, maintained that there was a high chance of success; in early autumn of 1641 he claimed having support of 48 senators with only few more needed to be won over. However, he was getting less and less credible; some Spaniards claimed that they were betting on the wrong horse and that Ossoliński should have been their man. In late 1641 the emperor Ferdinand III declared that no Polish army would be allowed to pass through his lands; Madrid sent Marqués de Castelo Rodrigo to Vienna to negotiate, but the envoy was only treated to suggestions that the entire deal be abandoned, with cheaper recruitment options in Denmark or Silesia. The position of Medina himself, the chief negotiator of the deal, was also becoming fragile; his political ally Cardinal Infante passed away and he was left relying solely on his family relation to Olivares. His personal prestige at stake, he kept claiming that all was negotiable and suggested that perhaps the Poles be used against the rebels in Catalonia, or at least recruit cossacks against pro-French Catalans in Reapers' War. Tuttavilla kept discussing terms of transit and in January 1642 he agreed on further details, supposed to make the passage of Poles acceptable to the emperor. However, at this point Madrid declared the entire deal unworkable and Medina was notified accordingly. The Poles were told that opposition on part of the emperor cancelled the project, while money originally intended for Warsaw was transferred to Flanders.

== Political and historiographic evaluation ==
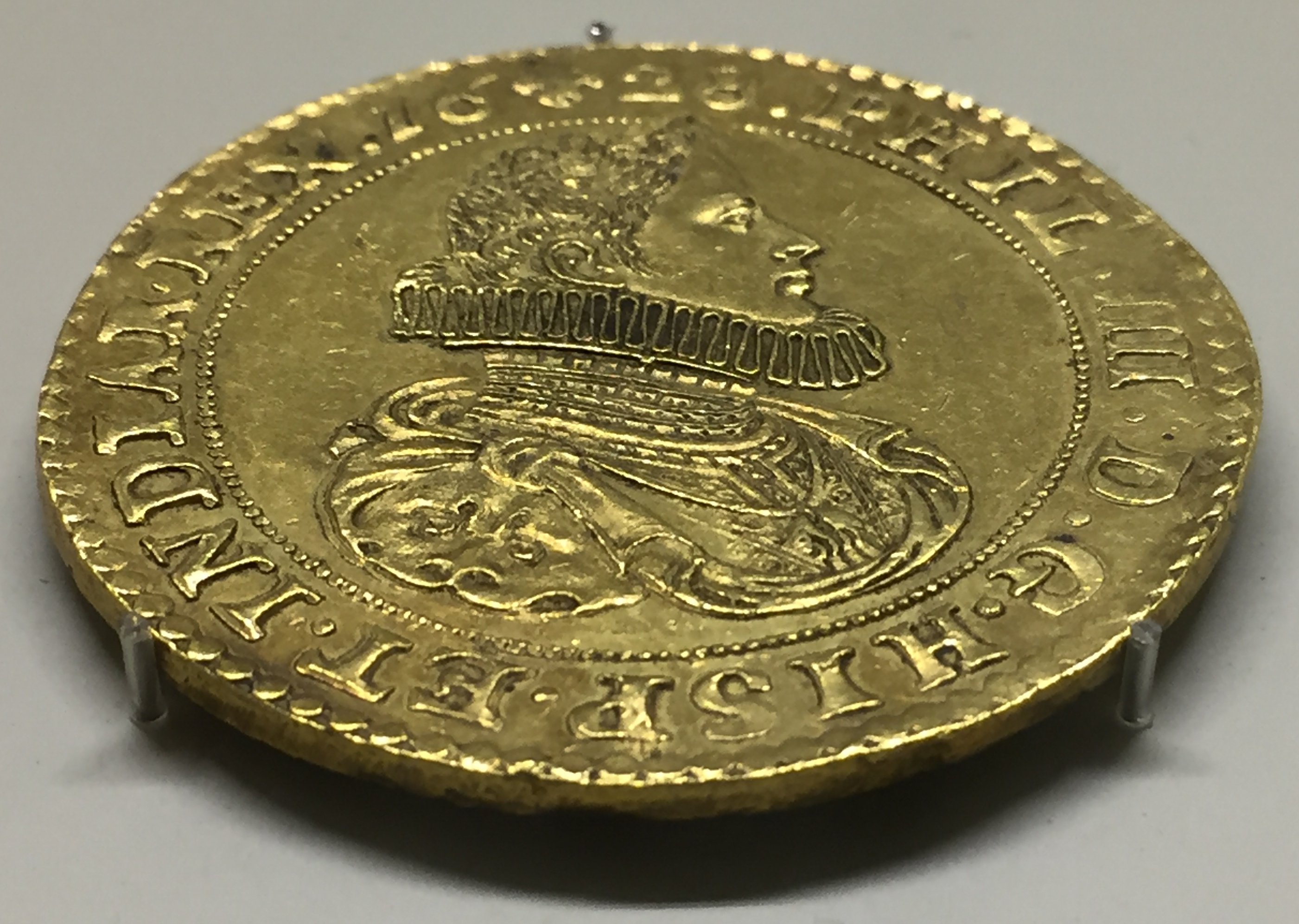
Golden coin of Felipe IV

In the aftermath of failed negotiations Spanish officials remained positive that the deal had been feasible and that errors on part of their diplomacy prevented the implementation. Medina was very critical about Castañeda and claimed the Vienna ambassador mishandled his mission, namely that appointment of Allegretti allowed the Poles to believe the treaty was negotiable. Marqués de la Fuente suggested the Spaniards relied on the wrong man in Warsaw. Following the later unrelated conflict of 1644 between the Poles and Medina in Naples, which contributed to his dismissal from the virrey position, some in Madrid started to harbor doubts about negotiating skills of Medina himself.

Spanish authors present the episode very much in terms of Poles bent on extracting as much money from the Spanish crown as possible. Accordingly, they attribute final collapse of the project to financial problems of Felipe IV, who was unable to pay for his ambitions. Another factor listed as contributing to failure was position adopted by the emperor; always skeptical about transit of the Poles across his territory; in key moments he refused the right of passage and effectively buried the project. Finally, it is noted that given Poland's deteriorating relations with Turkey, Warsaw turned its attention towards the South-East.

Polish historians have doubts about intentions of Władysław IV and suspect that he might have engaged in negotiations with the Spaniards with ill will, using them as an instrument enabling him to exert some pressure on the French. Some assume that his gamble was effective and that it produced liberation of prince John Casimir; afterwards the king lost any interest in military dealings with Felipe IV. Others suggest that neither the Spaniards nor the Poles were familiar with political conditions of their partners. The Madrid court assumed that in Poland position of the king was similar to this in Spain, and they did not realize that dealing with Władysław IV was far from dealing with the Kingdom of Poland. On the other hand, the Vasa diplomacy was misled into believing that Felipe IV possessed enormous resources and it was not aware of his perennial financial problems.

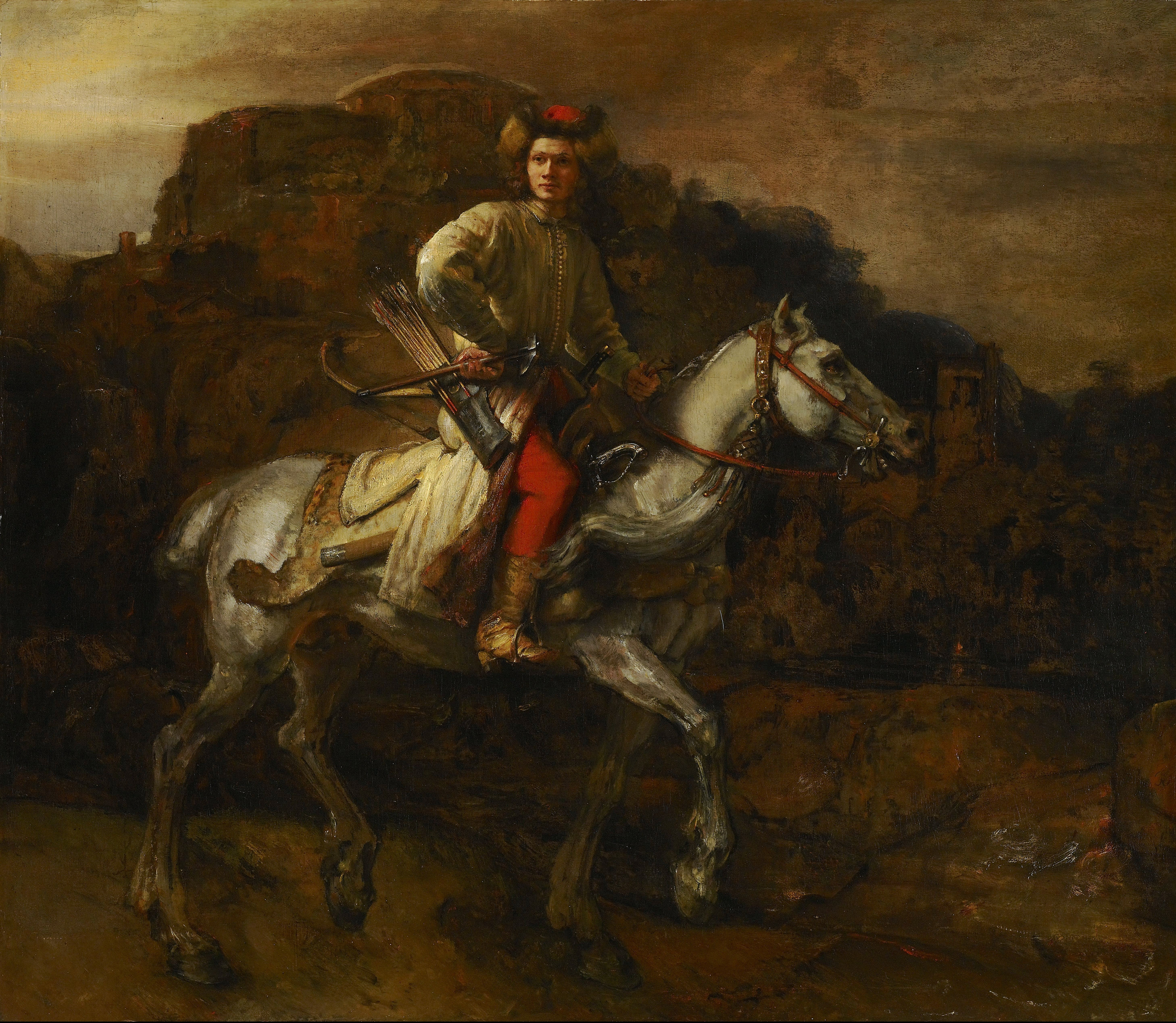
Lisowczyk by Rembrandt

Potential impact of the Naples-agreed Polish army in the Thirty Years' War remains nothing but a speculation. The Polish light cavalry formation known as lisowczycy, at times confused with cossacks, was briefly engaged in 1620 fighting in Upper Hungary; it achieved some success against Protestant troops, but gained opinion of an army that “God would not want and the devil would be afraid of”, which made its further employment doubtful. However, some of them were deployed in imperial ranks against the French in Flanders in the mid-1630s, where they confirmed their notorious status of indisciplined and brutal plunderers. Also some mercenary units previously at the Polish service were operating in Flanders, but their military potential was assessed as at best moderate and their number dwindled due to desertions. It is not known what would have been the result of combining Spanish tercios, at the time considered the best world infantry, with emblematic Polish winged hussars.

== See also ==
- Thirty Years' War
- Medina de las Torres
- Adam Kazanowski
