= Entrée (disambiguation) =

In French cuisine, an entrée is a prelude to a larger course within a single meal.

Entrée may also refer to:

- In English or French language, can describe the act or manner of entering; freedom of entry or access
- A North American synonym for the main course
- Entrée (ballet), ballet term for an entrance
- Entrée de ballet, an autonomous scene of ballet de cour or other staged forms
- European Network for Training and Research in Electrical Engineering, often abbreviated to ENTREE
- ENTREE Travel Newsletter, a travel newsletter established 1981
- "Entrée" (Hannibal), an episode of the television series Hannibal
