= Aleksander Dominik Kazanowski =

Polish noble (1605–1648)

- Coat of arms: Grzymała
- Died: February 1648
- Family: Kazanowski
- Consort: Anna Potocka
- Issue: Helena Kazanowska Marianna Kazanowska
- Father: Marcin Kazanowski
- Mother: Katarina Starzycka

Aleksander Dominik Kazanowski (1605 – February 1648), was a noble (szlachcic), magnate, voivode of Bracław Voivodeship in the Polish–Lithuanian Commonwealth.

Before 6 November 1646 he became a voivode of Bracław.

He married Anna Potocka. They had two daughters: Helena and Marianna Kazanowska (1643–1687), wife of Stanisław Jan Jabłonowski.
