= Marcin Kazanowski =

Polish nobleman (1563/1566–1636)

- Field Crown Hetman
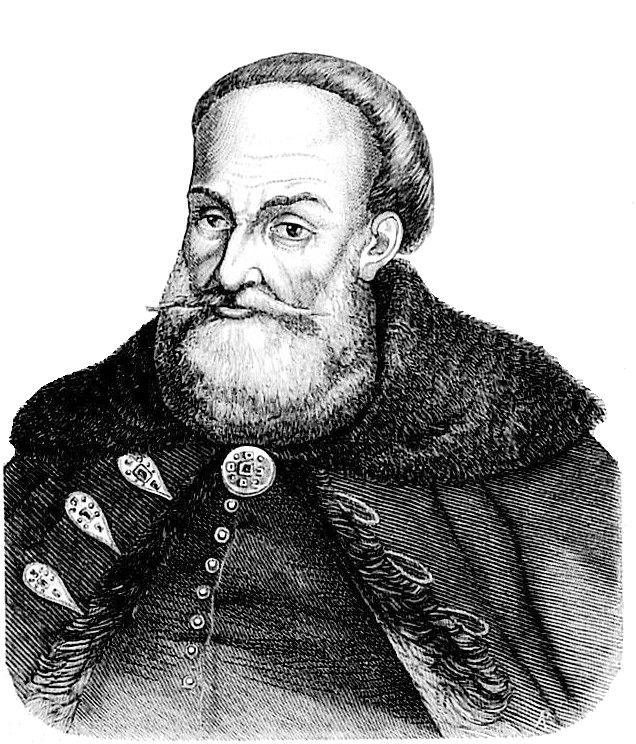
- Coat of arms: Grzymała
- Command: Polish–Lithuanian Commonwealth
- Predecessor: Stanisław Koniecpolski
- Successor: Mikołaj Potocki
- Born: 1563/66
- Died: 19 October 1636
- Consort: Katarzyna Starzycka
- Father: Mikołaj Kazanowski
- Mother: Katarzyna Korycinska

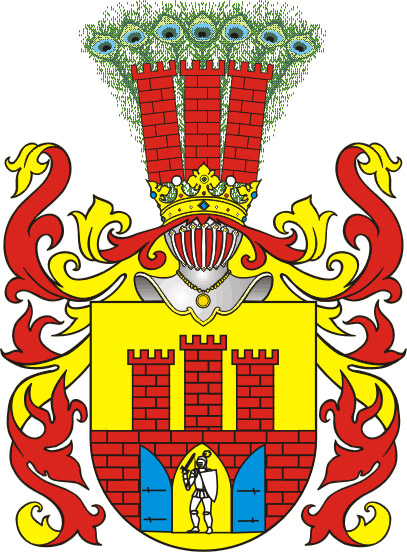
Grzymała coat of arms

Marcin Kazanowski (1563/66 – 19 October 1636) was a Polish noble and magnate.

Castellan of Halice from 1622, voivode of Podole Voivodeship from 1632 and Field Crown Hetman of the Polish–Lithuanian Commonwealth from 1633.

Married to Katarzyna Starzycka in 1600, he was the father of Dominik Aleksander Kazanowski (1605–1648), voivode of Bracław. His family, the Kazanowski family, descendants of Mediolan Comeses, founded the town of Kazanów in 1566.

Under Hetman Stanisław Koniecpolski, he was one of the commanding officers in the Battle of Górzno in 1629 against the Swedes.

The discovery legend of the Madonna Bołszowiecka relates that during one of the battles against Tatars, Hetman Kazanowski discovered the icon of the Blessed Virgin. This was viewed by his troops as a miracle and boosted their morale, leading to a victory.

Under King Władysław IV Vasa, he also participated in the wars against the Russian Tsardom.

== See also ==
- Adam Kazanowski
- Zygmunt Kazanowski
