= Zygmunt Kazanowski =

Polish noble, courtier and military commander (1563–1634)

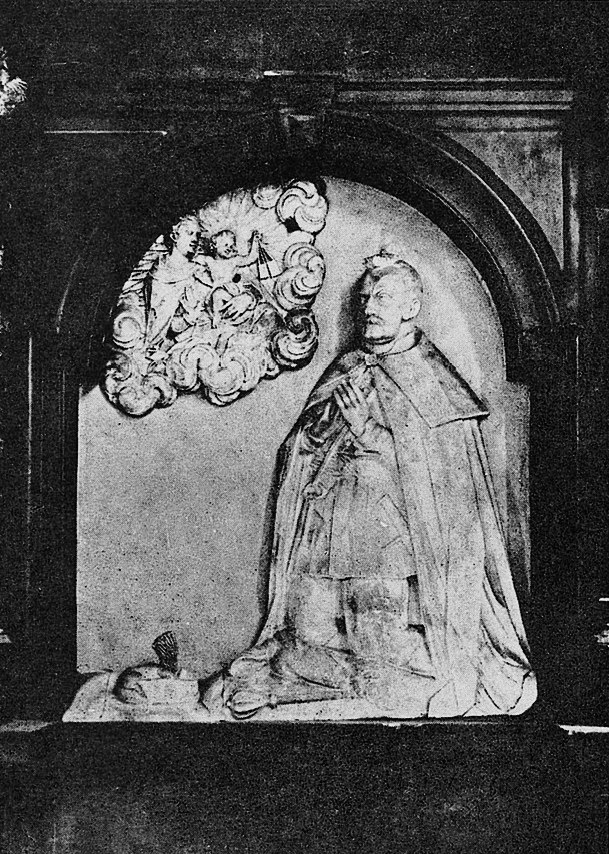
- Tomb monument of Zygmunt Kazanowski in the St. John's Cathedral in Warsaw
- Coat of arms: Grzymała
- Born: 1563
- Died: 1634 (aged 70–71)
- Buried: St. John's Archcathedral, Warsaw
- Wars and battles: Battle of Kircholm; Defense of Chocim
- Family: Kazanowski
- Consorts: Zofia Warszewicka; Elżbieta Humnicka
- Issue: Zofia Kazanowska; Helena Kazanowska; Katarzyna Kazanowska; Aleksandra Kazanowska; Stanisław Kazanowski (?–1648); Adam Kazanowski (1599–1649)
- Father: Marcin Kazanowski (1523–1587)

Zygmunt Kazanowski of the Grzymała coat of arms (born c. 1563, died 1634) was a noble (szlachcic) in the Polish–Lithuanian Commonwealth, He was a courtier to kings Stephen Báthory and Sigismund III Vasa, and a tutor, advisor and Court Chamberlain of the Crown to Prince and later King Władysław Vasa.

== Biography ==
=== Family ===
He was born around 1563. He was the son of the starost Marcin Kazanowski and Katarzyna Tarło.

Around 1590, he married Zofia Warszewicka, with whom he had children: Zofia Kazanowska (d. 1645), Helena (wife of Maksymilian Ossoliński), Katarzyna, Aleksandra, Stanisław, and Adam. Before 1615, he married Elżbieta Humnicka.

Zygmunt Kazanowski died on 13 August 1634 and was buried in St. John’s Collegiate Church in Warsaw, where his sons erected a monument to him.

=== Military career ===
From an early age he was trained in the art of war, initially serving as a companion in a hussar banner, later becoming its commander and receiving the rank of royal colonel. He participated in the wars of Stephen Báthory, including the Moldavian campaign of 1600, the Siege of Biały Kamień (Weissenstein) of 1602, and the Battle of Kircholm (1605).

He supported the royal court during the Zebrzydowski Rebellion; during this period (in 1607), a panegyric entitled Korona Polska bardzo smutna prośby serdeczne czyni (“The Polish Crown, deeply saddened, makes heartfelt pleas”) was dedicated to him.

During the Russian campaign of 1617, he supported his relative Marcin Kazanowski against Hetman Jan Karol Chodkiewicz, which historian Adam Przyboś assessed negatively as intrigue-driven factiousness.

He participated in the Chocim campaign, which was his last military expedition.

=== Political career ===
He served as a courtier at the courts of Stephen Báthory, Sigismund III Vasa, and Władysław IV Vasa. He educated court youth and Prince Władysław Vasa in military arts, becoming an influential royal adviser when Władysław ascended the throne. At Władysław’s court, from 1633 he held the rank of praefectus cubiculi (Court Chamberlain of the Crown), was a member of the war council, and played a significant role in the king’s campaigns.

From 1588, together with his brother Jan, he inherited from his father the starosty of Fellin. From 1607 he was starost of Kokenhusen; from 1613, starost of Krosno; from 1617 starost of Barcice, and from 1633 starost of Mukarów, Solec, and Kłobuck.

Before 1607, he participated in a diplomatic mission to Hungarian territories. He took part in the royal election of 1632 as a member of the delegation presenting the king-elect, and personally served as an elector of Władysław IV Vasa from the Sandomierz Voivodeship. He signed the king’s pacta conventa.

During the funerals of King Sigismund III and Queen Constance, he carried the royal insignia.

== Author ==
In 1630, he wrote Dyskurs o sejmie w 1630 r. (“Discourse on the Sejm of 1630”) concerning parliamentary reform. He was also the author of a work on the reign of Sigismund III entitled Res gestae Sigismundii Tertii Poloniae et Sueciae Regis, Magnique Ducis Lituaniae, dedicated to Prince Władysław.
