= Vid Silverforsens strand =

Single by Matz Bladhs
- A-side: "Vid Silverforsens strand"
- B-side: "Tre små ord"
- Released: 1995
- Label: Frituna
- Songwriters: Yngve Johansson, Britt Nilsson

Matz Bladhs singles chronology
"Jag ska älska dig/Spara lite kärlek till mig (Got a Lot o' Livin' to Do)" (1994)	"Vid Silverforsens strand" (1995)	"Vår dotter/Fryksdalsdans nr 2" (1995)

Vid Silverforsens strand is a song written by Yngve Johansson and Britt Nilsson. Lyrical, it deals with memories from old days rural Sweden.

A Matz Bladhs recording became a Svensktoppen success for 31 weeks between 27 January-24 August 1996, peaking at second position The single was released in 1995 sold 60 000 copies and the song also appeared on the album Leende dansmusik 95, released by late 1995. In 2005, the song was recorded by Bosse med komp.

The song has also been recorded by Britt Nilsson herself, released in 2001.
