= Jerzy Besala =

Polish historian and publicist

Jerzy Stanisław Besala (born 5 September 1951 in Warsaw) is a Polish historian and publicist. Author of over a dozen books and numerous articles. Some of his articles are published for general readers in popular Polish magazines and newspapers.

== Bibliography ==
- Stanisław Żółkiewski, Warszawa 1988, ISBN 83-06-01583-5.
- Stefan Batory, Warszawa 1992, ISBN 83-06-02253-X.
- Tajemnice historii Polski, Poznań 2003.
- Małżeństwa królewskie. Piastowie, Warszawa 2006.
- Małżeństwa królewskie. Jagiellonowie, Warszawa 2006.
- Małżeństwa królewskie. Władcy elekcyjni, Warszawa 2007.
- Tajemnicze dzieje Europy, Warszawa 2007.
- Barbara Radziwiłłówna i Zygmunt August, Warszawa 2007, ISBN 978-83-7391-715-6.
- Alkoholowe dzieje Polski. Czasy Piastów i Rzeczypospolitej szlacheckiej, Poznań 2015
- Rewizja nadzwyczajna. Skazy na królach i inne historie, Bellona 2018
