= Zofia z Radziwiłłów Dorohostajska =

Polish noblewoman (1577–1614)

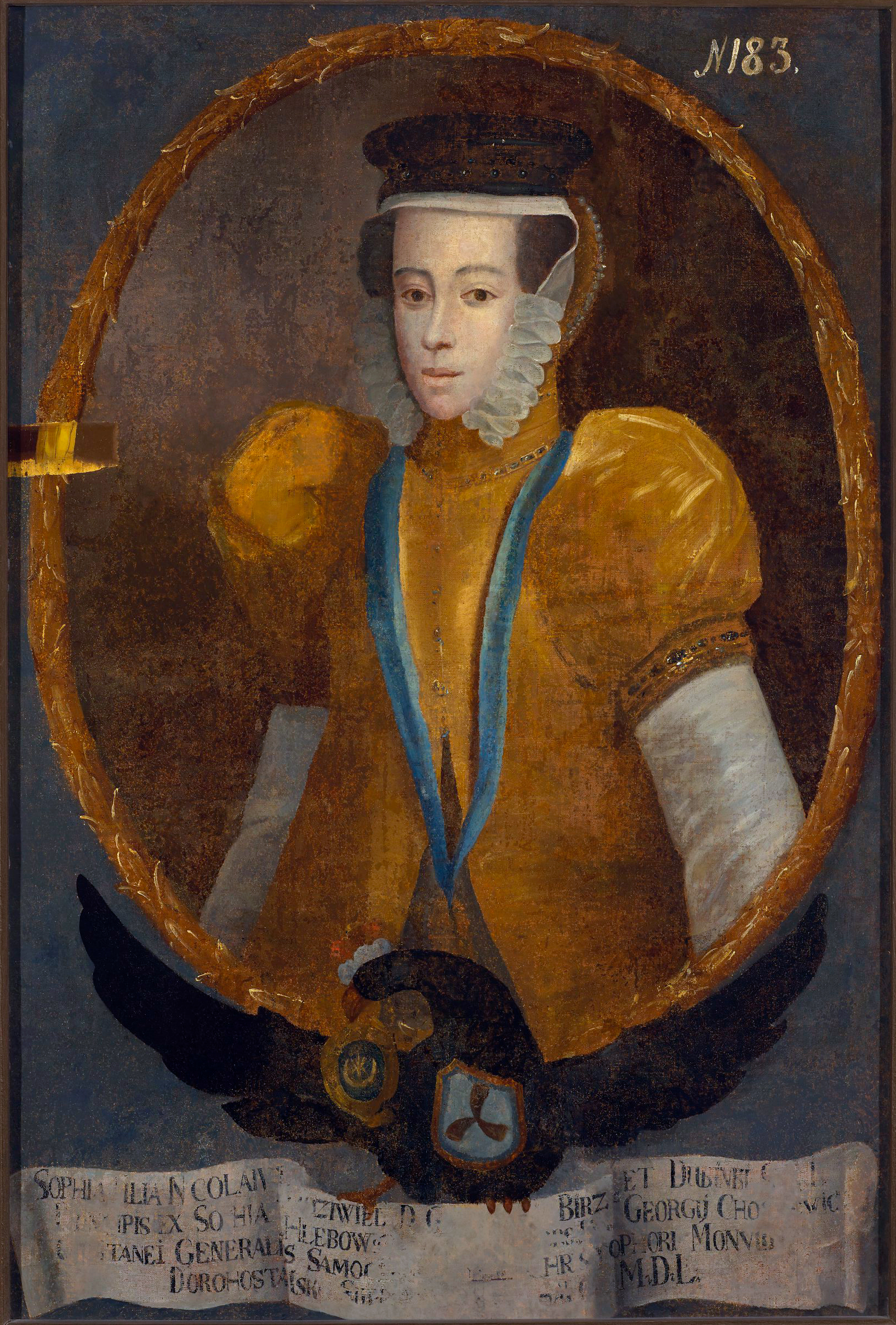
Sofja Darahastajskaja (Chadkievič, Radzivił). Соф’я Дарагастайская (Хадкевіч, Радзівіл)

Zofia z Radziwiłłów Dorohostajska (1577–1614), was a Polish noblewoman. She is known as the central figure of a famous scandal, in which she was exposed with adultery and as a punishment imprisoned by her husband and forced to submit to a life of penitence, an affair that attracted considerable attention in contemporary Poland.
