= Adam Kazanowski =

Polish noble (c. 1599 – 1649)

- Court Marshal of the Crown
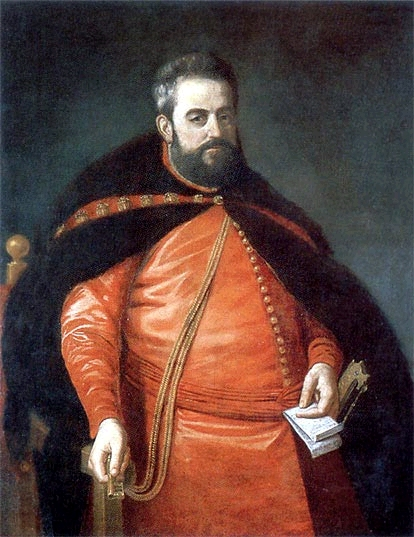
- Coat of arms: Grzymała
- Born: c. 1599; Polish–Lithuanian Commonwealth
- Died: 25 December 1649; Polish–Lithuanian Commonwealth
- Buried: St. John's Cathedral, Warsaw
- Family: Kazanowski
- Wife: Elżbieta Słuszczanka
- Father: Zygmunt Kazanowski
- Mother: Elżbieta Humnicka

Adam Kazanowski (c. 1599 – 25 December 1649) was a noble of the Polish–Lithuanian Commonwealth from 1633; Greater Crown Stolnik from 1634; Court Chamberlain (podkomorzy koronny) and castellan of Sandomierz from 1637; Court Marshall from 1643; żupnik of Wieliczka from 1642; starosta of Barcicki, Borysowski, Kozienicki, Rumieński, Solecki, Nowotarski, Warecki, and Bielski; and a close and influential friend of King Władysław IV Vasa.

== Biography ==
=== Early life ===
Together with his brother, Stanisław Kazanowski (starost of Krosno, Jaworów and Przedbor), Adam was raised with crown prince Władysław. He accompanied him during his attempt to become a Russian Tzar, in the Chocim war of 1621 and the 1620s European voyage. In 1631 he became the starost of Barcko. When Władysław became king in 1634, he was showered with gifts and new official titles. In 1634 he became the starost of Borysowo, and gained the rank of podstoli and soon after that, stolnik. Later that year he married Elżbieta Słuszczanka (later Hieronimowa Radziejowska, when she married Hieronim Radziejowski), but the couple stayed childless.

=== Royal titles and wealth ===
As a sign of friendship, Władysław bestowed many favours, positions and gifts to Kazanowski, who soon had his own palace in Warsaw. He soon became the richest magnate in Poland, and owned close to half of the Praga district in the capital. A contemporary writer, after his death, wrote: Never has Poland seen so much wealth in a private hand of a single man. Those many favours, especially coupled with both Kazanowski and Władysław lavish spending, raised many protests from the Commonwealth's parliament. They had, however, little effect on both Kazanowski and Władysław.

=== Opinion and influence ===
Kazanowski was viewed by many as a greedy, arrogant magnate with a 'bad influence' on the king, but he always remained close to Władysław. When Władysław's royal treasury ran dry once, Adam Kazanowski loaned him his money and mortgaged many of his goods, saying My liege, I cannot become poor when I am near to you, but I will not be rich without you. This friendship gave him enough political leverage to remain an important player in the Commonwealth's politics. Privy to the king's thoughts and secrets, and organiser of many lavish parties and festivities, he was marginally interested in the 'great (foreign) politics', but he was a powerful player in the smaller court intrigues. He knew many secrets of the royal court, and could influence Władysław to be friendly or not towards various newcomers, envoys and other visitors to the court.

His influence did diminish after 1637, when Władysław married Habsburg Archduchess Cecilia Renata of Austria. After that, Kazanowski became an enemy of the queen and other Habsburg supporters, like Jerzy Ossoliński, and allied himself with Piotr Gembicki (chancellor until 1642).

=== Death ===
Kazanowski died in 1649 and was buried in St. John's Cathedral in Warsaw.

== See also ==
- Kazanowski Palace
- Krzysztofory Palace
- Bielsk Podlaski
