= Entré (Matz Bladhs album) =

2009 Matz Bladhs studio album

Studio album by Matz Bladhs
- Released: December 23, 2009
- Genre: dansband music
- Label: Mariann Grammofon

Matz Bladhs chronology
| Upp till dans | Entré (2009) | Leende dansmusik 2012 (2012) |

Entré is a studio album by Matz Bladhs released 23 December 2009.

== Track listing ==
1. Tänd ett ljus i fönstret
2. Lille du
3. Varje steg jag tar
4. Du ska veta att jag saknar dig
5. En dag i taget
6. Godmorgon solsken
7. So Long
8. I Can't Stop Loving You
9. Personality
10. Tro mig
11. När ord inte räcker till
12. She's Not You

== Charts ==
| Chart (2010) | Peak position |
|---|---|
| Sweden (Sverigetopplistan) | 44 |
