= Kazanowski Palace =

Coordinates: 52°14′42″N 21°00′54″E

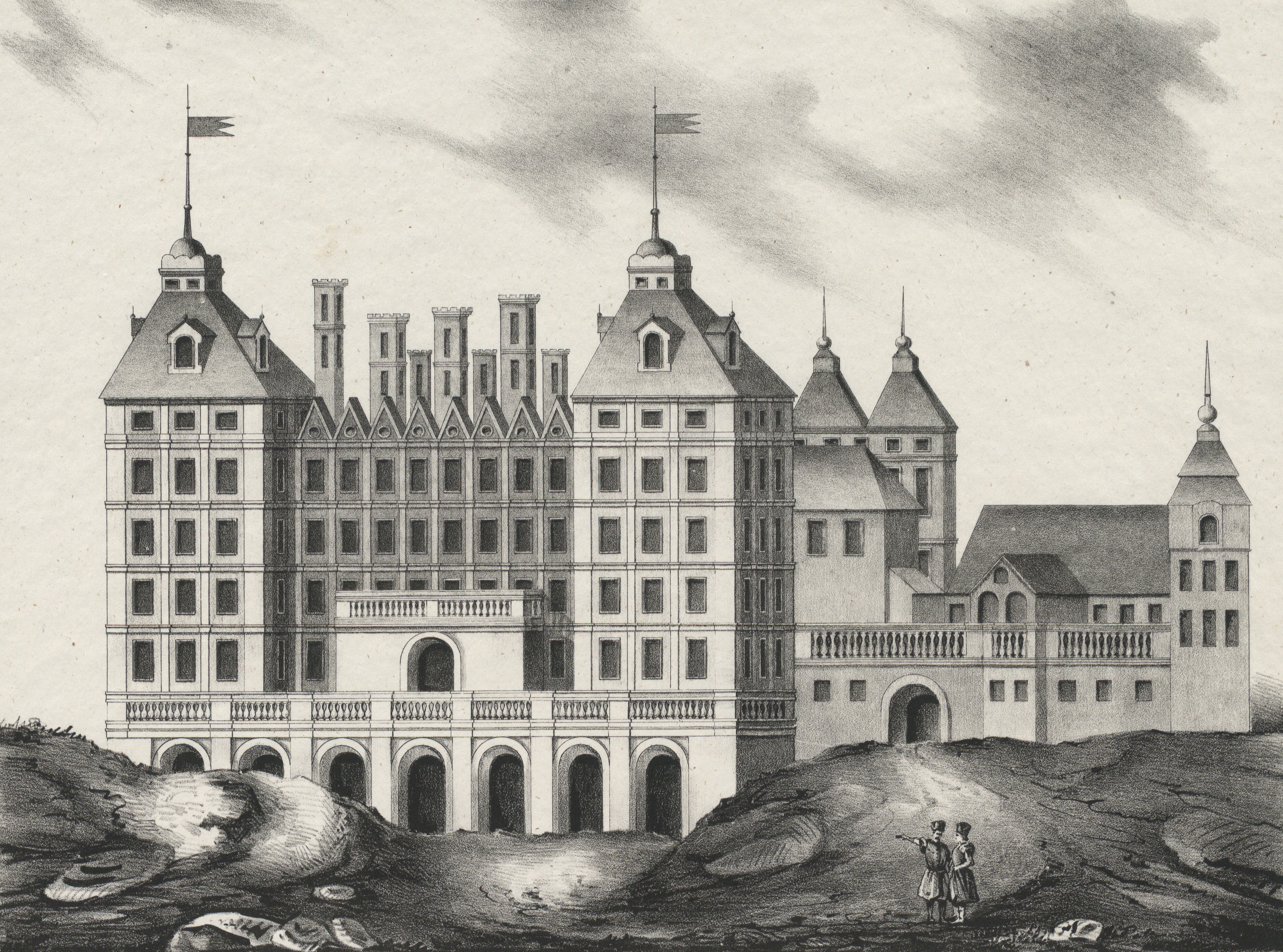
- 17th century image.
- Interactive map of the Kazanowski Palace area

General information
- Architectural style: Baroque
- Location: Warsaw, Poland
- Construction started: 1628
- Completed: 1643
- Demolished: 1656
- Client: Adam Kazanowski

Design and construction
- Architect: Constantino Tencalla

The Kazanowski Palace (Polish: pałac Kazanowskich), also known as the Radziejowski Palace, was a large palace in Warsaw, occupying the place where the Charitable Center Res Sacra Miser stands today.

== History ==
When prince Władysław Vasa (future King Władysław IV of Poland) became an adolescent, his father Sigismund III Vasa bought him a wooden mansion at the Krakowskie Przedmieście in Warsaw. Shortly after his return in 1628 from a journey to Western Europe the prince ordered Constantino Tencalla a court architect to build him a new palace in the Italian style. Tencalla created one of the most wonderful palaces ever built in Warsaw.

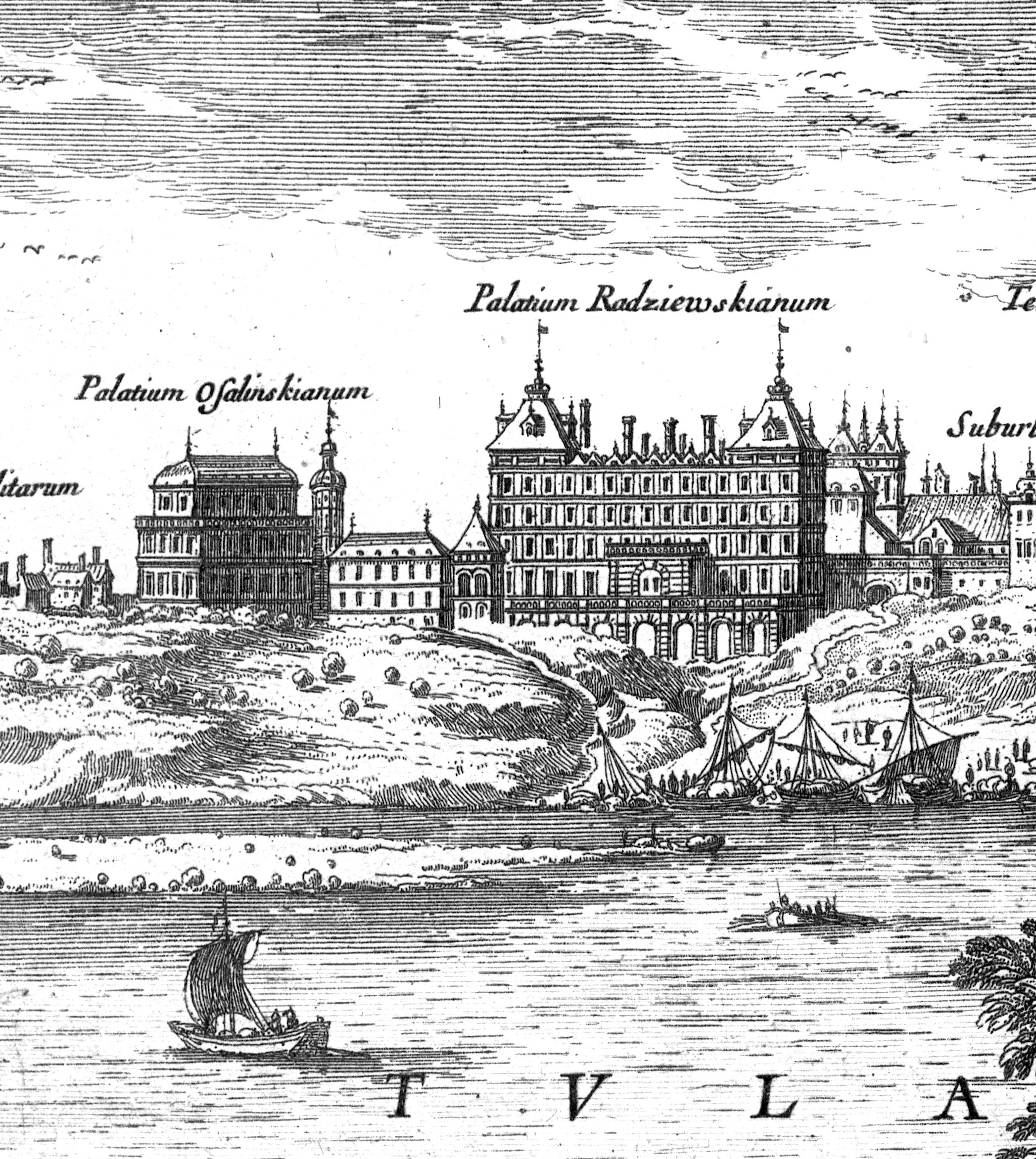
Ossoliński Palace (left) and Kazanowski Palace (right) in 1656.

In 1632, prince Władysław gave the palace to his favourite, Adam Kazanowski; this caused a serious misunderstanding with the King, and a special Sejm committee was appointed to determine the circumstances behind this gesture. In 1637, Kazanowski enlarged the building, holding to Tencalla's original designs. The new structure was a large four-storied palace with a garden, enormous terrace and central courtyard—alcove tops were decorated with gilded crowns.

The rich furnishings of the palace were described in 1646 by Jean Le Laboureur, a companion of the French Ambassador Extraordinaire to Poland, Madame de Guébriand. Le Laboureur was amazed by what he saw inside—a large statue of Bacchus made of pure silver sitting on a barrel with wheels (that served as a wine vessel during banquets), gilded wooden ceilings in the Venetian style, rooms filled with oil paintings, marble decorations, Flemish and oriental tapestries, oriental objects, furniture from Italy and Bavaria, silverware, a live bear inside a gilded cage in the courtyard, caged monkeys and a large collection of musical instruments belonging to Crown Court Marshal Kazanowski's private orchestra.

Le Laboureur later wrote:

Italy, which we visited after leaving Poland has nothing as magnificent and lordly. I admit that I was astonished, and it seemed that I had been transferred to an enchanted palace.

His patron Madame de Guébriand noted "the rooms [were] decorated with various cupboards of the most exquisite workmanship, and tables with the most beautiful objects in gold, silver and amber". Marshal Kazanowski, pleased with Madame de Guébriand delight at seeing the objects asked which items she would like to take back with her to France, and despite Madame's protests, he and his wife sent her several amber caskets.

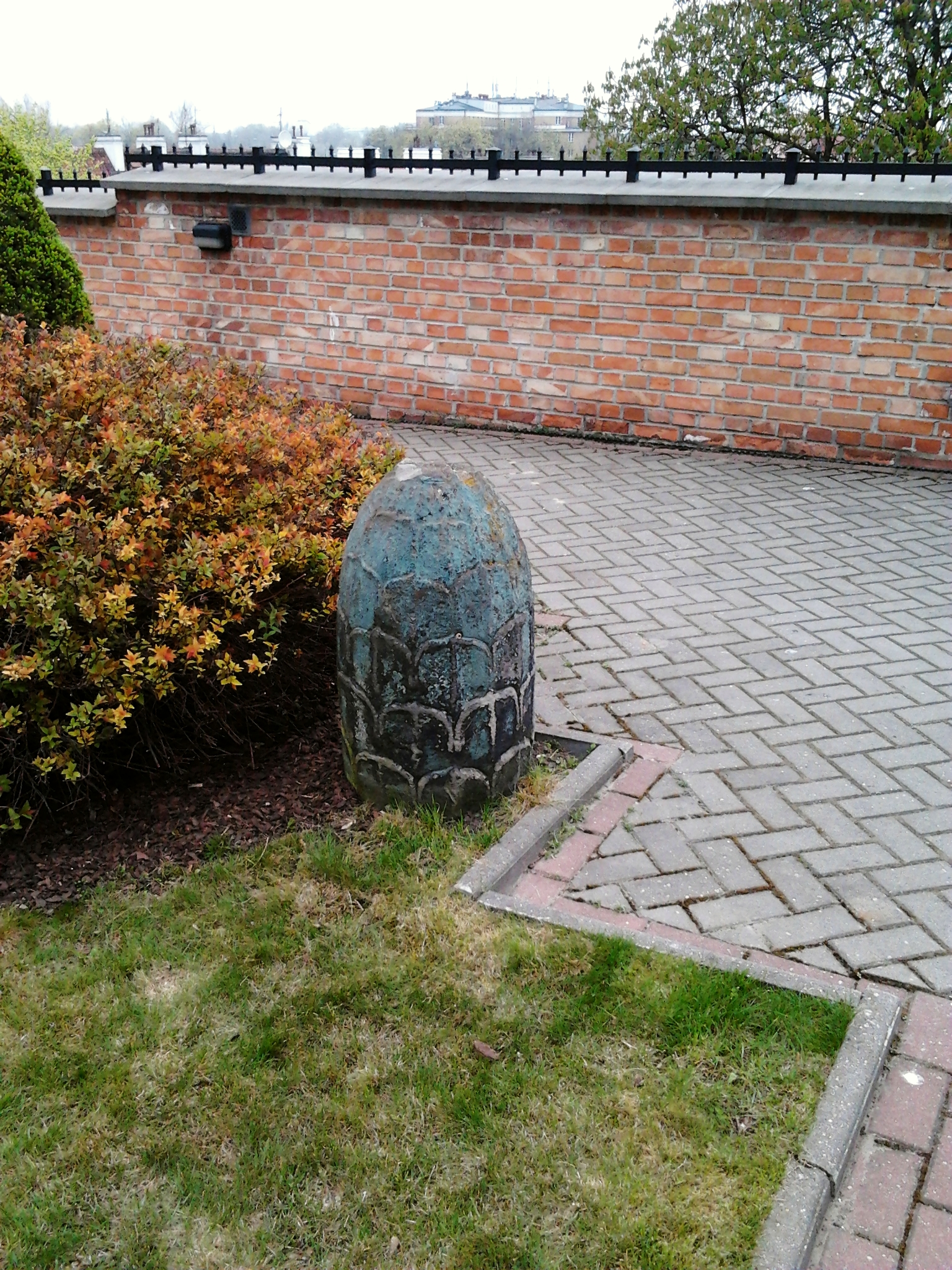
Remnants of the Kazanowski Palace, a decorative stone pinecone that once adorned the rooftop.

Kazanowski also arranged a cabinet of curiosities (Wunderkammer) in his palace that contained a large stuffed snake from Africa hanging from the ceiling, and an Indian sea turtle. The palace also had a terrace garden on the escarp side, and was notably famous not only because of its decadent furnishings, but also due to central heating and plumbing installed inside.

After Kazanowski's death the palace was passed on to his wife Elżbieta Słuszczanka, who some time later married Hieronim Radziejowski. At the time, she was the wealthiest woman in the Polish–Lithuanian Commonwealth. After Radziejowski was found guilty of treason against the King, she filed for divorce, which caused a small private war in Warsaw between Radziejowski and the Słuszka family who took the Kazanowski palace by force. Subsequently, Radziejowski was convicted and sentenced to the death penalty and had to escape the borders of the Commonwealth.

The opulent Kazanowski Palace was ransacked and burned down during the Deluge by the Swedes in 1656 and never rebuilt.
