= ENTREE Travel Newsletter =

Travel newsletter by Bill Tomicki

ENTREE Travel Newsletter (established 1981) is a travel newsletter by American writer Bill Tomicki. It bills itself as "An uncompromising and confidential travelers newsletter."

As of 2014, it has over 22,000 subscribers. Tomicki said then when it started in 1981, it was the third travel newsletter in the industry. It is targeted to upscale clientele, Tomicki said Entree's average reader is between 45 and 55, and has a household income of $455,000 a year.

In 2006, Tomicki described the newsletter operations: "I have a staff of 12--four permanent people based in Santa Barbara, Calif.," where he lives, "and eight stringers around the world who contribute information, which I then edit and assemble in the newsletter."

The newsletter has been reviewed in the Chicago Tribune, The New York Times, and the Los Angeles Times.

== Bill Tomicki ==
William Tomicki is an American travel writer. Since 1981 he is the publisher of the ENTREE Travel Newsletter, which has been called the "Rolls Royce of travel newsletters" where "Each month Mr. Tomicki skewers the mediocre and exalts excellence so that his readers do not waste their time and money". Tomicki claims he personally writes "60 to 70 percent of the content based on his own travels." In 1990, Joel Sleed of the Seattle Times called him "outspoken."

He serves as Travel and Restaurant Editor for the American-International News Syndicate, Travel Editor for El Paso Inc. Magazine, and Senior Editor for Traveler Overseas Magazine. He has been a member of the International Food Wine & Travel Writers Association (IFWTWA) He is also a former syndicated Travel Writer for The New York Times. "Most newspapers and magazines tend to be too PR oriented. I try to tell it as it is, talk to the reader as a friend, tips where to go, where not to go."

In an article, Tomicki was asked if hoteliers ever spend time in their own hotels: "We guess not, judging by the missteps we find so often, like square soaps, soaps that are wrapped too tightly with plastic or paper ... We hate soap dispensers in the bath, phones we cannot figure out, lighting that takes a visit from the engineer to decipher and any hotel that puts so much reading crap in the room that you can't find a place for your own crap. And stop turning the radio on when we are not there, please. And not coming back for the room service table."

In 2008, Tomicki won a million dollars in a lottery.
