= Matz Bladhs =

Swedish dansband, formed 1968

- Origin: Falkenberg, Sweden
- Genres: Dansband
- Years active: 1968–present
- Label: Platina
- Website: matz-bladhs.se

Matz Bladhs is a Swedish dansband formed in Falkenberg in 1968.

== Members ==
Conductor

- Niclas Olén

Vocals

- Hans Schmid (1981–1983)
- Göran Lindberg (1983–1991)
- Paul Sahlin (1991–2004)
- Göran Lindberg (2004–2010)
- Conny Nilsson (2010–present) - also guitar

Instruments

- Lars Olof Karlsson (1987–present) - guitar - also backing vocals
- Niclas Olén (2000–present) - keyboards
- Sören Kenstam (2011–present) - drummer
- Håkan Nordling (2011–present) - saxophone, also guitar and flute

== Albums ==
(Peak positions in Sverigetopplistan in brackets, wherever applicable)

- 1972: Bland blommor och blad
- 1974: På me' tröja och jeans
- 1977: Det var så länge se'n
- 1978: Min högsta önskan
- 1981: Leende dansmusik 81
- 1982: Leende dansmusik 82
- 1983: Leende dansmusik 83 (SWE #50)
- 1984: Leende dansmusik 84 (SWE #37)
- 1985: Leende dansmusik 85
- 1986: Leende dansmusik 86
- 1987: Leende dansmusik 87
- 1988: Leende dansmusik 88 (SWE #16)
- 1989: Leende dansmusik 89
- 1990: Leende dansmusik 90
- 1991: Leende dansmusik 91
- 1992: Leende dansmusik 92
- 1993: Leende dansmusik 93
- 1994: Leende dansmusik 94
- 1995: Leende dansmusik 95 (SWE #57)
- 1997: Leende dansmusik 97 (SWE #55)
- 1999: Tack för alla åren
- 2001: Leende dansmusik
- 2004: 20 gobitar 2005 (SWE #33)
- 2006: Godbitar 2006 (SWE #30)
- 2008: Ljus och värme - Matz Bladhs bästa låtar (SWE #60)
- 2009: Upp till dans
- 2009: Entré (SWE #44)
- 2012: Leende dansmusik 2012 (SWE #9)
- 2013: Leende dansmusik 2013 (SWE #9)
- 2014: Hem igen (SWE #4)
- 2018: Här och nu (SWE #20)

== Svensktoppen songs ==
- 1987: Aj, aj, aj, jag svävar i det blå
- 1987: Senorita
- 1988: Lite blyg
- 1992: Kärleken ska segra
- 1993: I en gul luftballong
- 1993/94: Livets stora gåta
- 1994: Klockorna ska ringa
- 1994/95: Jag ska älska dig
- 1995: En liten röd bukett
- 1996: Vid Silverforsens strand
- 1997: Den första dagen
- 1997: Som en ros i ett regn
- 1998/99: Varje liten stjärna
- 1999: Det faller ett regn
- 2000: Över Öresund
- 2001: Sommar & sol

=== Failed to enter chart ===
- 1969: Har inte någon sett min brud
- 1990: En dag i sänder
- 1991: En kärleksaffär
- 1999: Jag vet vad kärlek är
