= Grzymała coat of arms =

Polish coat of arms

Grzymała
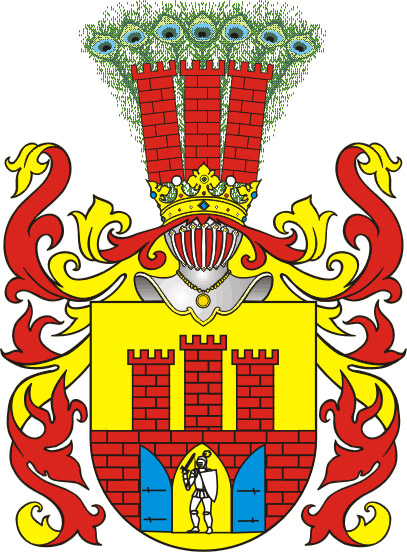
- Battle cry: Grzymała
- Alternative names: Grzymalita, Ślasa (Slasa)
- Earliest mention: 1272
- Towns: Grzymała, north Poland and Grzymała, south Poland
- Families: 291 names altogether: Albigowski, Baranowski, Bartold, Bartołd, Bączewski, Bieganowicz, Bieganowski, Biestrzykowski, Bieszczycki, Biezdziecki, Bieżczyński, Binczycki, Bobalicki, Borkacki, Borkowski, Bortkiewicz, Borzewicki, Bosowski, Brodowski, Broński, Brogłowski, Brzeczka, Brzozogłowski, Buckiewicz, Buczow, Budat, Budgin, Budziszewski, Burkard, Burkardt, Busiński, Buszyński, Cetwiński, Chodziewski, Chrościński, Chwalikowski, Cidzik, Ciesielski, Ciunowicz, Czapski, Czuszowski, Długołeński, Długołęcki, Długoski, Dłuski, Dobiecki, Dobrodziejski, Domarat, Domaszowski, Domejko, Domeyko, Dubowiecki, Dziekanowski, Dzierżanowski, Dzięcielski, Fedorkowicz, Frangemberg, Frankenberg, Freyberg, Garwacki, Garwaski, Gąsiński, Gąsowski, Gąssowski, Gilewicz, Głogowski, Gojski, Goścki, Goślicki, Górski, Grabowiecki, Grabowski, Gromolewski, Grudniewski, Grudziński, Gruszkowski, Grzymajłło, Grzymajło, Grzymalski, Grzymała, Grzymałowski, Grzymkowski, Grzymułtowski, Gutteter, Habowski, Hałaczkiewicz, Harassowski, Herubinowicz, Hoffman, Hrymalicz, Imielański, Iwieński, Jabłonowski, Jabłoński, Jaźwiński, Jukowski, Jurkowicz, Kalborski, Kaliborski, Kalibowski, Kamocyński, Kamodziński, Kazanowski, Kazłowski, Kazonowicz, Kijski, Kikowski, Klonowski, Kobylański, Kobyleński, Kobyliński, Kocłowski, Komodziński, Korczak, Krol, Krzemieniowski, Krzemienowski, Kwot, Kwotor, Kytor, Lagona, Langmin, Leciński, Lesznikowski, Leśnikowski, Leśniowski, Litwiński, Litwiński vel Wiklański, Litworz, Litwosz, Lityński, Losos, Lubański, Lubczyński, Lubiatowski, Ludzicki, Łagiewnicki, Łagiewski, Łagona, Łagowski, Łaguna, Łaszczewski, Łaszewski, Łazanowski, Łącki, Łopienicki, Łudzicki, Łudziecki, Machwicz, Malocha, Małachowski, Małgowski, Małkch, Marciszowski, Margoński, Matusiak, Meisinger, Mileski, Mniszewski, Modrzewski, Mokulski, Morze, Moszczyński, Niecikowski, Niegolewski, Niepruszowski, Noiński, Ochenkowicz, Ochenkowski, Odachowski, Olejewski, Oleski, Olesznicki, Opalacz, Ostrowski, Parzniczewski, Palaszewski, Perski, Pęczalicki, Pęczkowski, Pęczlicki, Pęczyński, Piątkowski, Pierski, Pierzcheński, Pierzchnowski, Pietrski, Pintowski, Podleski, Podlewski, Podniestrzański, Podolski, Podsosnowski, Pogorell, Pogorzelecki, Pogorzelski, Pokrzywnicki, Potulicki, Pradzeński, Prandota, Prądzewski, Prądzyński, Prządzewski, Przeciszewski, Przejrzeński, Przyborowicz, Przyborowski, Przybylski, Przybyłek, Przybyłko, Przybyłowski, Przybyszewski, Rachfałowski, Racławicki, Radowicki, Raszewski, Raszowski, Redwanowski, Rybczyński, Rybski, Rychlicki, Rymwidowicz, Rynwid, Rynwidowicz, Rzepliński, Siedlecki, Siemianowski, Silberschwecht, Skoczyński, Skotnicki, Slaski, Słomowski, Smerzyński, Smogulecki, Soboliński, Sojecki, Strękowski, Strzelecki, Suchywilk, Swiszowski, Szczaworyski, Szczaworzyski, Szmerzyński, Ślaski (ie. Slaski), Śleżyński, Śmiłowski, Świdrygiełł, Świdrygiełło, Świeradzki, Świszowski, Troszczeński, Troszczewski, Truszczeński, Truszczyński, Turzański, Turzebin, Turzyński, Ujejski, von Zelberschwecht, Wabiszewicz, Wielgórski, Wielogórski, Wieszczycki, Wiewiorowski, Wilamowski, Wilanowski, Wilkau, Wilkowski, Wizgint, Wodźbun, Wojdzbun, Wojno, Wojzbun, Woydzbun, Woyno, Wskrzeński, Wskrzyński, Wydrzyński, Zaborowski, Zaleski, Zamoścki, Zasadzki, Zawalczyc, Zawalczyk, Zbierchowski, Zbierzchowski, Zbikowski, Zbykalski, Zedlitz, Zieleński, Zieliński, Znatowicz, Zut, Zwierzchowski, Zwierzyński, Żarnowiecki, Żbikowski, Zelberschwecht, Zylberschweg

Grzymała is a Polish coat of arms. It was used by several noble families in the times of the Polish–Lithuanian Commonwealth.

== History ==
Some authorities believe that this coat of arms was brought to Poland from Germany by a knight named Zylberschweg or Zelberszwecht. It is, however, one of the oldest Polish coats of arms, whose clan's war cry was Grzymała (for Thunder). The original homeland of this clan was the district of Łomża in Masovia. The coat of arms was later augmented to reflect a knight in full battle armor standing in the gate, whose left arm held a shield, whose right arm held a raised sword. This augmentation was received by Przecław Grzymała, for his courageous defense of the city Płock in 1078 against the Jatwings from Prince Władisław Hermann.

Subsequently the coat of arms was also abated: Prince Boleslaw Wstydliwy of Poland (1127–1179), exiled the knight Grzymała, owner of Goślice in the Palatinate of Płock, on the suspicion of treacherous dealings with Prince Kazimierz of Kujaw, and as further evidence of the Prince's displeasure closed the gate in this knight's coat of arms.

A second (though positive) abatement also occurred: When the Lithuanians along with the Jatwings attacked Masovia, a Grzymała, owner of Zielony and Slasy, courageously stood against them, inflicted a defeat upon them and hunted them down. For which feat of arms, the coat of arms was abated around the knight and the gate, leaving only a wall with towers, where there used to also be a rampart.

== Notable bearers ==
Notable bearers of this coat of arms include:

- Wawrzyniec Grzymala Goslicki
- Marcin Kazanowski
- Ignacy Prądzyński
- Janusz Suchywilk
- Mark Zbikowski
- Adam Grzymała-Siedlecki
- Eugene Gromczynski

== See also ==
- Polish heraldry
- Heraldry
- Coat of arms
