= List of ship launches in the 1620s =

The list of ship launches in the 1620s includes a chronological list of some ships launched from 1620 to 1629.

	Ship	Class / type	Builder	Location	Country	Notes
1620	Garland	Third-rate warship	Deptford Dockyard	London	England	For Royal Navy
1620	Victory	Carrack	Deptford Dockyard	London	England	For Royal Navy
1621	Bonaventure	Third-rate warship	Deptford Dockyard	London	England	For Royal Navy
1621	Leeuwin	Galleon merchant			Dutch Republic	For Dutch East India Company
1621	Nuestra Señora de Atocha	Galleon merchant	Havana Shipyard	Havana	Spanish Empire	For King Philip IV
1621	Swiftsure	Carrack	Deptford Dockyard	London	England	For Royal Navy
1621	Tryall	East Indiaman			England	For British East India Company
1622	St Andrew	Carrack	Deptford Dockyard	London	England	For Royal Navy
1622	St George	Carrack	Deptford Dockyard	London	England	For Royal Navy
1623	Król Dawid	Galleon merchant		Gdańsk	Polish-Lithuanian Commonwealth	
1623	Mary Rose	Fourth-rate frigate	Deptford Dockyard	London	England	For Royal Navy
1623	Triumph	Second-rate warship	Deptford Dockyard	London	England	For Royal Navy
1625	Arka Noego	War pinnace		Gdańsk	Polish-Lithuanian Commonwealth	For Polish–Lithuanian Commonwealth Navy
1626	Gulden Zeepaert	East Indiaman			Dutch Republic	For Dutch East India Company
March 1627	Vasa	Galleon warship	Skeppsgården	Stockholm	Sweden	For Svenska marinen
1627	Kalmar Nyckel	Full-rigged pinnace		Kalmar	Sweden	For Skeppskompaniet
1627	Merchant Royal	Galleon merchant	Deptford Dockyard	London	England	For Captain Limbrey
1627	Ritter Sankt Georg	Galleon warship		Puck	Polish-Lithuanian Commonwealth	For Polish–Lithuanian Commonwealth Navy
1627	Samson	Fifth-rate warship			Dutch Republic	For Admiralty of the Noorderkwartier
1627	Stora Sofia	Ship of the line	Slottö Shipyard	Nakskov	Denmark–Norway	For Royal Danish Navy
October 1628	Batavia	East Indiaman		Amsterdam	Dutch Republic	For Dutch East India Company
October 1628	Sardam	Yacht	Chamber of Amsterdam	Amsterdam	Dutch Republic	For Dutch East India Company
