= Commonwealth Navy =

Commonwealth Navy may refer to:

- Royal Navy, the successor of the navy of the 17th-century Commonwealth of England
- Polish–Lithuanian Commonwealth Navy, the naval forces of Poland-Lithuania in the early 17th century
