= Król Dawid =

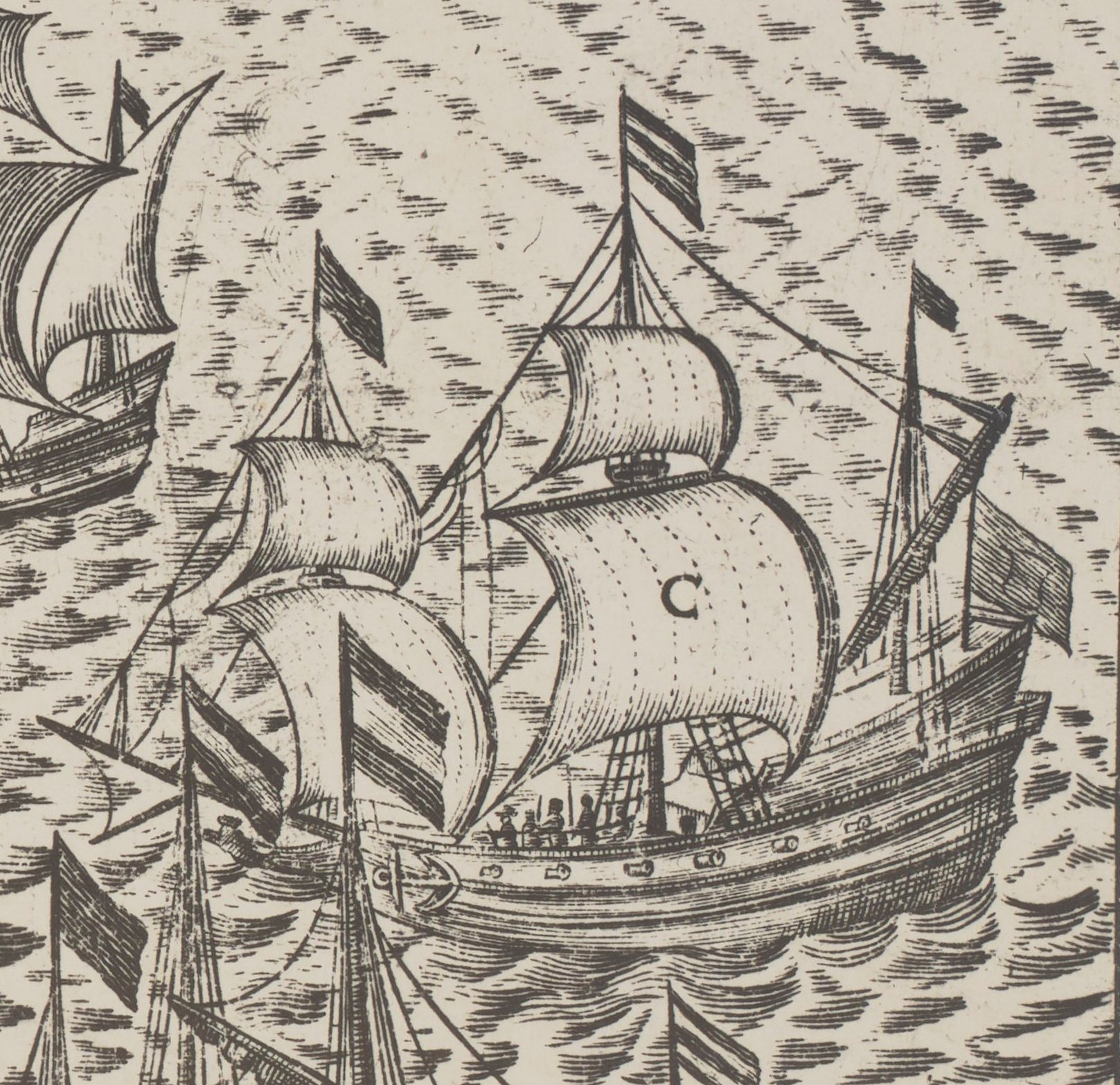

History

Polish–Lithuanian Commonwealth
- Name: König David (Król Dawid)
- Namesake: King David
- Launched: 1623
- Commissioned: 1626
- Decommissioned: c. 1630
- Fate: Captured by the citizens of Lübeck

General characteristics
- Tons burthen: 400
- Length: approximately 34 m (112 ft)
- Beam: approximately 7.5 m (25 ft)
- Complement: 60 (and up to 100 marines)
- Armament: 31 guns of various calibres; 2 stone throwers

Król Dawid (English: "King David") was a 31-gun galleon of the Polish–Lithuanian Commonwealth Navy that fought in the Battle of Oliwa. She was launched as König David at Danzig in 1623 as a merchant ship.

During the Polish-Lithuanian wars with Sweden, it was drafted into the Polish–Lithuanian Commonwealth navy along with Wodnik and Arka Noego. They fought in the Battle of Hel on 17 May 1627. After a short artillery duel the skirmish was over. The following day the escadrille met a convoy of 24 Swedish vessels off the coast of Biała Góra, near Łeba. After a short artillery barrage, the Commonwealth's ships managed to evade the enemy and headed for Kolberg (Kołobrzeg). Several days afterwards the escadre managed to break through the Swedish blockade and returned to Wisłoujście, one of two main bases of the Polish-Lithuanian Navy.

Under the command of a Scottish captain and shipbuilder Jakub Murray, the ship took part in the victorious battle of Oliwa of 28 November 1627. However, the ship played only a minor role and failed to support Wodnik in her attack on Swedish galleon Solen yet received some damage. After the battle the command was given to Gregor Fentross, who also became the admiral of the Polish-Lithuanian fleet. Thus König David became the flagship of the entire Polish-Lithuanian Navy. However, during the Swedish assault on Wisłoujście of 6 July 1628, admiral Fentross was killed and the ship received some damage due to artillery fire. All Commonwealth's ships were withdrawn up the Vistula river.

In January 1629, the ship was rented by king Sigismund III Vasa to the Habsburg-led Catholic League and served during the Thirty Years' War. Stationed in Wismar, the ship fought against Danish and Swedish fleets at the Baltic Sea and the Northern Sea. In November 1630, however, chased by a Swedish pursuit escadre, König David was forced to seek refuge in Lübeck and was then interned by the locals. The further fate of the ship remains unknown.
