= Deus Meus =

Polish Christian band

Deus Meus is a Polish band that plays Christian music, mainly soul, funk, and reggae.

== History ==
The band was formed in 1994 during Christian Musicians Meeting in Ludźmierz by father Andrzej Bujnowski, Dominican, and people from Kamień Pomorski participating in that meeting: Ewa Feret, Hubert Kowalski, and religious women (Communio Sororum Discipularum Crucis) from Szczecin: Ancilla Krysmalska and Franciszka Godlewska. The musicians were later joined by Mietek Szcześniak and Marcin Pospieszalski - their later arranger and producer of their albums.

Their first album, Hej, Jezu! (Hey, Jesus!) was released in 1995 by Cracovian publisher "M". It was renewed several times, becoming one of the first Christian music albums on Polish market, and was sold in over 50 thousands of copies. Year after, in 1996, Deus Meus released Słońce nagle zgasło (Sun suddenly went out) which contained Polish lenten songs. In the years after new albums were released: Jezus zwyciężył (Jesus won) in 1997 with Oweyo group, Mój Jezus (My Jesus), in 1998 Chwała Barankowi (Glory to the Lamb), in 2002 Jahwe, and in 2012 Wniebowianki (lit. Crowns into the heaven).

With Deus Meus, as guests, played: Robert Amirian, kids of Arka Noego (Noah's Ark), Tomasz Budzyński, Golec brothers, Mietek Szcześniak, and Michał Kulenty. They performed also during International Festival Song of Songs in Toruń (1998–2000, 2005).

Their performances include:

- Meeting with John Paul II in Gliwice
- Ecumenical Reunion in Gniezno in 2004, 2005, and 2007
- Pope's Concerts in Teatr Wielki and National Theatre in Warsaw (broadcast by TVP in 2001 and 2002)
- International Festival of Sacral Music in Częstochowa
- Pope's Cross Exposition - Piłsudski Square in Warsaw
- John Paul's relics ceremony in Kraków
- Jan Popiełuszko's beatification ceremony in Warsaw
- "Do Źródła", vigil on the occasion of John Paul's II canonisation

Aside from many concerts played in Poland, Deus Meus took part in other's musicians' musical projects, TV programmes, and radio shows. The band started also conducting musical workshops i.e. the one in 2013 Deus Meus for Szczecin's citizens, enriching local activities' culture. They lead some music workshops in Łódź, Radom, and Warsaw. Deus Meus' choristers have been initiators and co-creators of Christian music initiatives in Poland, but also abroad, i.e. Liturgical Music Workshop (various cities in Poland and UK), annual concerts of One Heart - One Spirit in Rzeszów (international project), Musical Workshops with New Life, Diocesan Musical Workshops in Radom. The members of Deus Meus have also many individual projects as musicians, singers, conductors, songwriters.

== Members ==
Instrumental group that co-created the Wniebowianki album:

- Michał Starkiewicz (guitars)
- Marcin Pospieszalski (bass)
- Tomasz Basiuk (keyboard instruments)
- Kamil Cudzich (drums)
- Thomas Celis Sanchez (percussion instruments)
- Daniel Pomorski (trumpet)
- Łukasz Kluczniak (saxophone)

Dozens of people took part in Deus Meus musical career.

== Discography ==
- Hej, Jezu! (released in 1995 under Mucial Initiative of Ludźmierz banner)
- Słońce Nagle Zgasło (1996)
- Mój Jezus (1997)
- Jezus Zwyciężył! (1997; recorded 26 July 1996 in Gorzów Wielkopolski during the meeting of Odnowa Charyzmatyczna group)
- Chwała Barankowi (1998)
- Jahwe (2002)
- Trasa (2006; concerts)
- Wniebowianki (2012)
