= Arend Dickmann =

Admiral of the Polish–Lithuanian Commonwealth Navy (1572-1627)

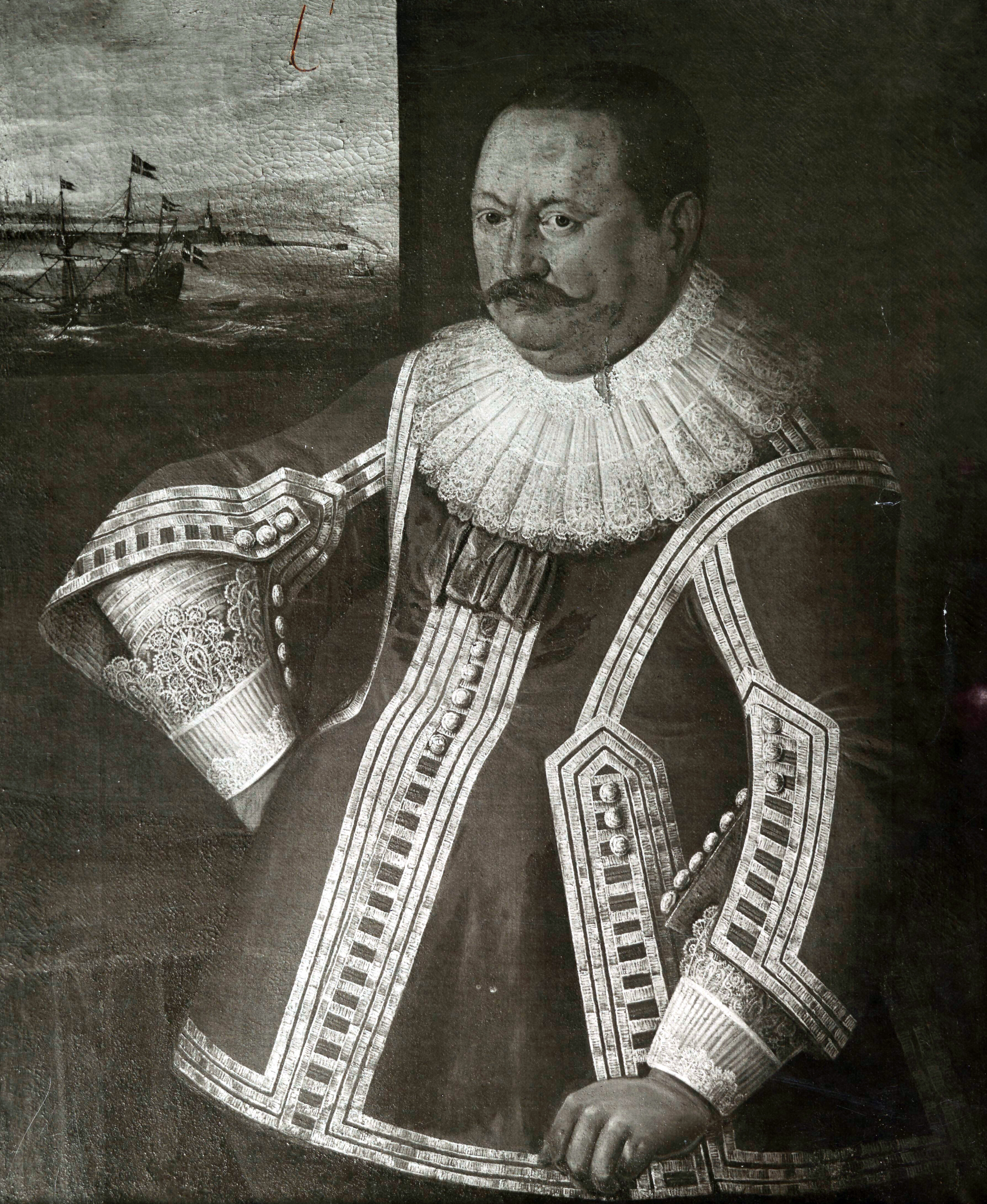
- Born: 1572; Delft, Netherlands
- Died: 28 November 1627 (aged 54–55); Gdańsk Bay
- Military career
- Allegiance: Polish–Lithuanian Commonwealth
- Branch: Polish–Lithuanian Commonwealth Navy
- Service years: 1626–1627
- Rank: Admiral
- Units: 1st Squadron
- Conflicts: Polish–Swedish War: Battle of Oliwa †

Admiral Arend Dickmann (Dutch: [ˈaː.rənt ˈdɪk.mɑn]; 1572 – 28 November 1627) was a Polish–Lithuanian Commonwealth Navy officer. Born in Delft to a Dutch family, he led the Polish–Lithuanian navy to victory in the 1627 Battle of Oliwa during the Polish–Swedish War, where he was killed in action.

== Early life ==
Arend Dickmann was born in Delft, Netherlands in 1572. Since 1608, he lived in Gdańsk, Polish–Lithuanian Commonwealth, where he was the captain and owner of a merchant ship that transported cereal and oak wood.

== Military career and death ==
In 1626, he joined the Polish–Lithuanian Commonwealth Navy during the Polish–Swedish War. On 24 November 1627, he was given the rank of admiral, becoming the commander-in-chief of the navy. He served aboard the fleet flagship Ritter Sankt Georg. On 28 November 1627, he commanded the fleet during the Battle of Oliwa, a major encounter during the war, that was fought in the Gdańsk Bay. During the battle, his ship had attacked and boarded the enemy galleon Tigern. The fight aboard the ship ended with a Polish victory and the capture of the vessel. Dickmann also forced the crew of another Swedish warship, Solen, to scuttle their vessel. Ritter Sankt Georg had also fired from the broadside, hitting the enemy galleon Pelikanen. Dickmann ultimately perished on the deck of the Tigern from major leg trauma, having been hit by a stray round shot potentially from either the enemy Pelikanen or in friendly fire from Fliegender Hirsch. Ritter Sankt Georg itself sustained the damages in the battle, including being hit 3 times below the waterline.

== Funeral ==
He was ceremonially buried on 2 December 1627 in St. Mary's Church, Gdańsk. The funeral was financed by King Sigismund III Vasa. Before his coffin marched 33 pairs of bound Swedish prisoners of war. The coffin was accompanied by a marine guard of honour, royal officials, and members of the City Council. The coffin was laid to rest in the northern wall of the chancel, near the Saint John chapel.

== Citations ==
=== Bibliography ===
- J. Pertek: Polacy na morzach i oceanach, vol. 1, Poznań: Wydaw. Poznańskie, 1981, ISBN 83-210-0141-6, OCLC 749548852.
