= James Murray (naval officer) =

Scottish shipbuilder in the Polish service

- Born: c. 1500s Unknown, Kingdom of Scotland
- Died: c. 1600s Poznań, Polish–Lithuanian Commonwealth
- Military career
- Allegiance: Poland–Lithuania
- Branch: Polish–Lithuanian Commonwealth Navy
- Rank: Rear-Admiral
- Conflicts: Polish–Swedish War (1626–1629): Battle of Oliwa

Rear-Admiral James Murray (c. 1500s – c. 1600s) was a Polish–Lithuanian Commonwealth Navy officer. Born in Scotland, he emigrated to the Polish–Lithuanian Commonwealth and worked as a shipbuilder and naval officer during the reign of Sigismund III Vasa. He designed the galleon Król Dawid and in 1627 commanded it at the Battle of Oliwa during the Polish–Swedish War.
