= Treaty of Stuhmsdorf =

1635 peace between Sweden and Poland-Lithuania

Truce of Stuhmsdorf (Note: Rozejm w Sztumskiej Wsi)
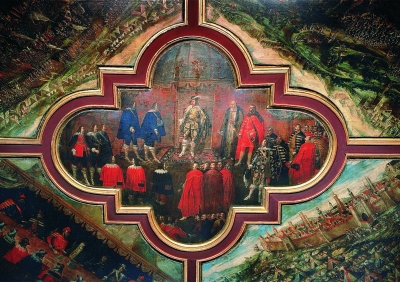
- Treaty of Stuhmsdorf, wall painting from Kielce Castle, showing Chancellor Jakub Zadzik, Władysław IV and Hetman Stanisław Koniecpolski
- Signed: 12 September 1635
- Location: Sztumska Wieś, Poland
- Parties: Polish–Lithuanian Commonwealth; Swedish Empire
- Languages: German

The Treaty of Stuhmsdorf (Note: Swedish: Stilleståndet i Stuhmsdorf, also known as Treaty of Sztumska Wieś Polish: Rozejm w Sztumskiej Wsi), was signed on 12 September 1635 in Sztumska Wieś, Poland, between the Polish–Lithuanian Commonwealth and Sweden. With the latter weakened by its involvement in the Thirty Years' War, it extended the 1629 Truce of Altmark for 26 1/2 years, with Sweden making significant concessions.

Although the Commonwealth regained many territories lost during the Polish–Swedish War (1600–1629), in return Sweden secured its acquisitions in the Baltic Sea. This allowed them to focus on the Holy Roman Empire without worrying about a possible new front. The truce lasted until the outbreak of the Second Northern War in 1655.

== Background ==
The Polish–Lithuanian Commonwealth was divided. King Władysław IV Vasa of Poland, from the Swedish House of Vasa, wanted to regain the Swedish crown, which had been held and then lost by his father, Sigismund III. As that was a daunting task, his less-ambitious motivations were to gain fame and strengthen his position in the Commonwealth, whose Golden Liberties made the king's position among the weakest in Europe. He hoped that the goals would be achieved by the war and argued that the Commonwealth could gain more by warring with Sweden, but he was also not averse to peaceful resolution if it gave him what he wanted. He thought that the negotiations gave him the opportunity to trade his right to the Swedish crown for a hereditary claim to one of the regained lands (he was supported by the primate of Poland, Jan Wężyk), and he entrusted that matter to the Prussian mediators.

His szlachta (nobility) advisors, representing the legislature (Sejm), were not convinced that the war would be beneficial, but many (like Chancellor and Bishop Jakub Zadzik, Hetman Stanisław Koniecpolski and Royal Secretary and Voivode Stanisław Lubomirski) agreed that the Swedes had to leave Poland by negotiations if possible but by war if necessary. Few, however, wished the war to continue for the sake of helping Władysław regain the Swedish crown, and, as usual, there was much disagreement between his allies, who wanted to strengthen his power, and those who feared that any victory for the king would mean loss for the nobility.

=== Sweden ===
After the recent setbacks that Sweden and its allies suffered in Germany, such as the Battle of Nördlingen and the defection of the Electorate of Saxony, the Swedish negotiating position had been somewhat weakened. Nonetheless, the Swedes realised that their recent gains in Germany were much less easy to defend than the territories they captured from the Commonwealth in Prussia and Livonia and so they preferred to sacrifice German to Prussian territories. They were, however, willing to give up their conquests in Prussia if Władysław renounced his claim to the Swedish crown and the Swedes retained their conquests in Livonia.

Sweden's position was also weakened by the disagreements in its government, as there was a power struggle between Chancellor Axel Oxenstierna and his opponents in the Swedish Riksdag. Some of the struggles led to leaks that gave leverage to the Polish.

=== International involvement ===
Many European powers were interested in the outcome of the negotiations and were also named as mediators by the 1629 Truce of Altmark, which gave them ample opportunity to influence the outcome of the Polish–Swedish negotiations.

==== France, England and Netherlands ====
Peace between Poland and Sweden was also supported by French Cardinal Richelieu, who wanted to weaken the Holy Roman Empire by using Sweden and German Protestants to keep Germany divided and embroiled in conflict. To that end, he needed Sweden to remain in the Thirty Years' War and therefore wanted ensure Poland's neutrality. Richelieu had no wish to see Poland open a second front in Prussia and so he dispatched Claude d'Avaux, one of his trusted negotiators.

French efforts were supported by the Dutch and English ambassadors at the conference and expedited by a lavish flow of money. England sent the former military commander Sir George Douglas with instructions to support Władysław, especially as there were negotiations between Poland and England on a possible marriage between Władysław and an English princess, which eventually failed. Dutch envoys included Rochus van den Honaert, Andries Bicker and Joachim Andraee.

==== Brandenburg-Prussia ====
George William, Duke of Prussia and Prince-elector of Brandenburg, was interested in a peaceful resolution of the Polish–Swedish conflict, as he did not want his lands to be affected by a new round of warfare. Because the Duchy of Prussia had failed to fulfill its feudal obligations as a vassal of Poland by not lending it military support, George William's rule in Prussia was suspended, and he was replaced by the Polish king by a viceroy, Jerzy Ossoliński.

Brandenburg's mediators included Andreas Kreutz, Johan Georg Saucken and Peter Bergmann.

== Early negotiations ==
The negotiations started on 24 January 1635 in the Prussian village of Preussisch Holland (Pasłęk). Polish negotiators were led by Bishop and Chancellor Jakub Zadzik and included Hetman Krzysztof Radziwiłł, Voivode of Bełsk Rafał Leszczyński, Crown referendarz Remigian Zaleski, Starost of Dorpat, Ernest Denhoff and Starost of Stężyce, Abraham Gołuchowski. Swedish negotiators were led by Per Brahe the Younger and included the governor of Prussia, Herman Wrangel, and the advisors Sten Bielke, Achacy Axelson and Johan Nicodemi.

The early negotiations were unsuccessful, as both sides played delaying tactics, disputed the titles of their monarchs and awaited most of the international mediators (only Brandenburg was present). Although the Swedes expected that the delay would be to their benefit, Władysław played their refusal to negotiate to the Sejm. With the support of some magnates like Albrycht Stanisław Radziwiłł, who advocated the expansion of the Polish–Lithuanian Commonwealth Navy, the Sejm was convinced to vote for new, significant taxes. Even before the vote was passed, Władysław had gathered a new army of about 21,000 soldiers, sent Jerzy Ossoliński to gather Polish allies in non-occupied Prussia and, with the help of Danzig (Gdańsk) merchant Georg Hewel (Jerzy), bought ten ships to be converted into warships and established the Sea Commission (Komisja Morska) led by Gerard Denhoff.

== Later negotiations ==
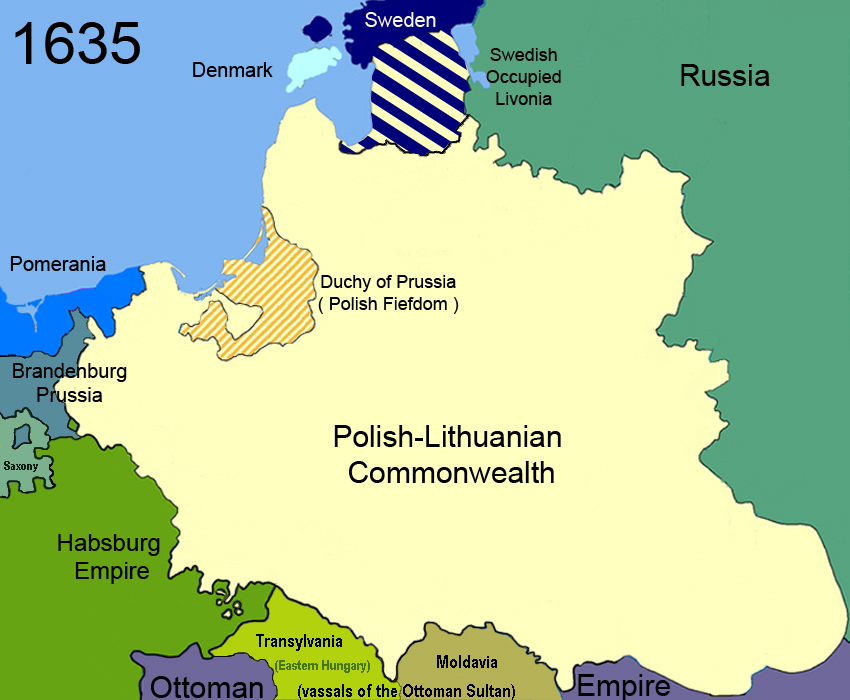
Poland at the time of the negotiations, 1635

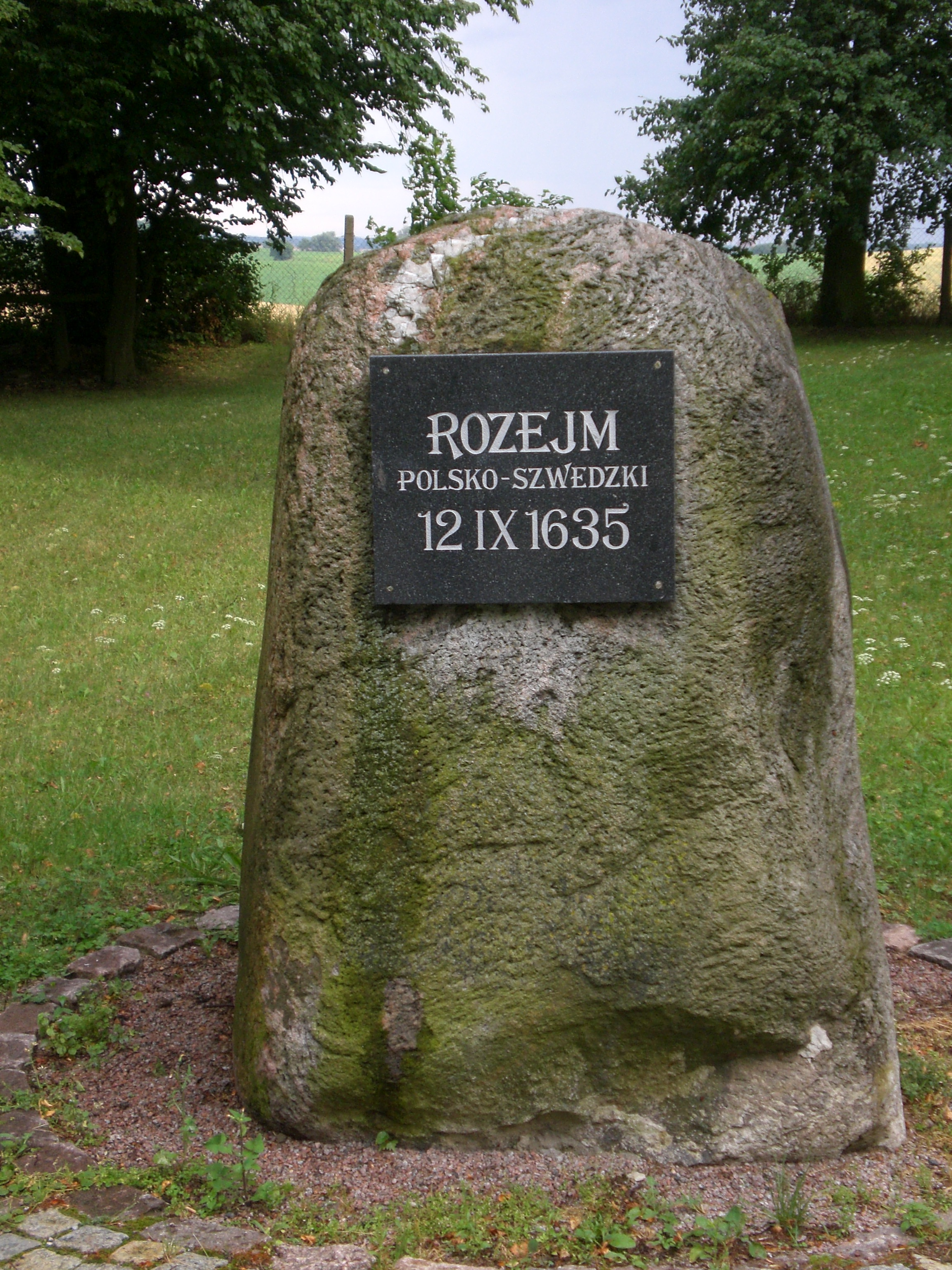
Memorial stone in Sztumska Wieś

In the few months between the Preussisch Holland and the Stuhmsdorf negotiations, the military and political situation of Sweden further worsened, with more defeats in the field, and more allies defecting to the Holy Roman Empire. The Swedes were more willing to discuss their retreat from Prussia and were more wary of the war against Poland. By the end of March, they were ready to accept most of the Polish terms.

On 24 May, negotiations began in Stuhmsdorf, but the Polish negotiators had their quarters in nearby Jonasdorf (Jankowiec) and Swedes in Marienwerder (Kwidzyń). Foreign mediators arrived and Swedish negotiators were joined by Jacob De la Gardie, and on the Polish side, Krzysztof Radziwłł was replaced by Jakub Sobieski.

After the first month and a half, the idea of a peace was discarded, and Swedes proposed to retreat from all of Prussia for a 50-year truce if Władysław renounced his claims to the Swedish crown.

Both the Polish magnates and the delegates of the nobility from local sejmiks saw no reason to fight when Sweden was offering them favourable concessions without any need for bloodshed and trade losses, which would surely occur if they pressed for war. That was in consideration of the expenses of the recent Smolensk War against Russia and the Polish–Ottoman War (1633–1634), coupled with the unrest in the southeastern provinces, where occasional Tatar raids, supported by the Ottomans, required a significant presence of the Polish forces. Władysław, who had managed to gather significant forces on the border and twelve ships at sea, was disappointed to realise that he now had almost no support from the szlachta for the war, Krzysztof Radziwiłł being one of the few left, even though Władysław had gained almost nothing from the treaty. Nonetheless, he was eventually convinced by his advisors to sign the treaty without gaining much for himself.

The treaty eventually proved to be a partial disappointment to Oxenstierna and a partial victory of his opponents in the Riksdag, but Oxensierna, who was hoping Sweden would not be forced into so many concessions, succeeded in keeping Sweden involved in the German war despite many calls from the Riksdag for the complete withdrawal of Swedish forces from that area.

George William's desire for a settlement giving him undisturbed possession of Ducal Prussia prevailed over the imperialist policy, which Adam von Schwarzenberg had successfully advised, acceding to the Peace of Prague. The Treaty of Stuhmsdorf left Brandenburg in full possession of Ducal Prussia, but by freeing the Swedish troops under Lennart Torstenson, which had been occupying Prussia and Livonia, it placed both Mecklenburg and Pomerania in the power of Sweden. The treaty also jeopardised the prospect of the acquisition of Pomerania by the House of Hohenzollern on the death, which was imminent, of Duke Bogislaw XIV, and seriously threatened the security of the County of Mark. Therefore, the treaty could be seen as a political mistake by George William, whose gains in the short term were outweighed by his losses in the long term.

== Terms ==
The treaty signed on 12 September introduced a truce for 26 1/2 years. The truce was an extension of the Truce of Altmark. The Swedes retained the Duchy of Livonia north of the Daugava River and the town of Riga but had to guarantee its Catholics the right to worship. Further, the Swedes had to return the territories they occupied in Baltic Prussia (Elbing (Elbląg), Memel (Klaipėda) and Pillau (Baltiysk), the last two returning to George William, Elector of Brandenburg, and to withdraw their garrisons from them. The Swedes also ceded the right to collect tariffs (3.5%) from the Polish trade through the Baltic Sea passing through Danzig, which had been a sore spot to the szlachta for whom the grain trade through Danzig had been a major source of income. The Swedes also were to return the ships of the Commonwealth Navy they seized in the past years, but the Commonwealth Navy was forbidden from supporting enemies of Sweden.

== Sources ==
- Kotilaine, Jarmo; Poe, Marshall (2004). Modernizing Muscovy: reform and social change in seventeenth-century Russia. Routledge. ISBN 0-415-30751-1.
- Roberts, Michael (1984). The Swedish Imperial Experience 1560-1718. Cambridge University Press. ISBN 0-521-27889-9.
