= Arka Noego =

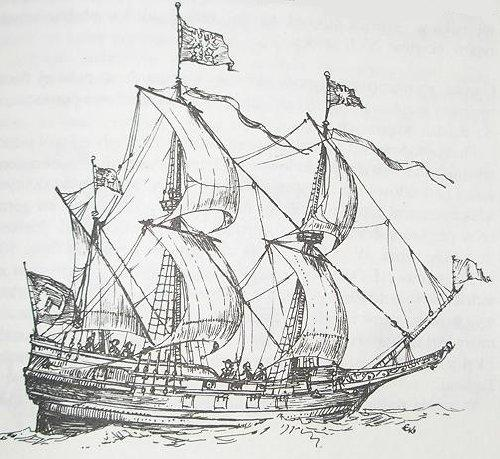
- Arka Noego, Polish Navy war pinnace, 1625.

History

Poland
- Name: Arka Noego
- Launched: 1625
- Acquired: ?1625
- Commissioned: ?1625
- In service: 1625–1632
- Out of service: 1632
- Home port: Gdańsk, Poland
- Fate: Captured by Sweden, January 1632

General characteristics
- Type: Pinnace
- Displacement: 180 tons
- Length: 23.7 ft (7.2 m)
- Beam: 6.8 ft (2.1 m)
- Draft: na
- Sail plan: At least three rigs were possible: a) square-rigged main mast, gaff-rigged second mast, square sail under bowsprit, topsail; b) fore-and-aft rigged with spirit mainsail; and/or c) aft-rigged mizzen mast with lateen sail.
- Speed: 2–10 knots (3.7–18.5 km/h)
- Range: offshore, ocean
- Complement: 35 sailors, 50-70 Polish Navy Marines
- Armament: 16 'small' caliber cannon; 3 pierrier à boîte (breech-loading, swivel gun)
- Notes: Old historical sources use German names for Polish Navy ships of this era.

Arka Noego was a war pinnace in the Polish–Lithuanian Commonwealth Navy that played an important role in two naval battles of the Polish–Swedish War (1626–29). Small, fast and lightly armed when compared to the impressive man-of-war galleons of the Swedish Navy, excellent leadership, a fine crew and aggressive marines combined to bring the Arka Noego into parity with her larger opponents. Major roles in two impressive victories followed in the fall of 1627.

== Battle at Hel, May 17, 1627 ==
The Arka Noego (“Noah's Ark”) was a 16-gun war pinnace that was built for the Polish Navy in 1625. Her Master was Magnus Wesman and her home port was Gdańsk, in the Polish–Lithuanian Complex. She saw significant action on more than one occasion.

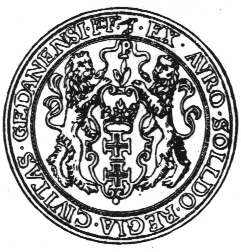
Gdańsk coin, 1589

On May 17, 1627, with the galleons Król Dawid and Wodnik (King David and Aquarius), the Arka Noego engaged a squadron of the Swedish Navy in the vicinity of Hel, Poland. The two forces separated after a brief exchange of cannon fire. The next day, the Arka Noego was attacked by elements of a 24-ship Swedish Leba convoy. After a brief exchange of cannon fire, the much larger Swedish convoy broke through and sailed to Kołobrzeg. During the fight, one cannon on the Arka Noego blew up but caused little damage. After a few days, the Polish ships returned to the Wisłoujście squad after running the Swedish blockage of Gdańsk Bay.

The Arka Nuevo was captured by the Swedish Navy, sometime in 1635 and her fate thereafter is unknown.

== Battle of Oliwa, November 28, 1627 ==
Arka Noego was one of five war ships in the 2nd Polish Naval squadron that fought several larger Swedish men-of-war in the Battle of Oliwa (Battle of Oliva, Battle of Gdańsk Roadstead), on November 28, 1627. Ten Polish ships attacked a small Swedish fleet of six ships outside Gdańsk (Danzig) harbour, near the village of Oliva (Oliwa). The strong Swedish Navy maintained a blockade of the Baltic shore, especially Oliva harbor. Although the tiny Polish Navy of nine ships outnumbered the Swedish flotilla arrayed against them, only four ships were galleons outfitted for heavy combat. Furthermore, the Polish Navy was not battle hardened as was the experienced Swedish Navy which was a recognized European sea power.

The ten-ship Polish fleet was commanded by Admiral Arend Dickmann in the galleon Sankt George (Święy Jerzy) which was anchored at the Danzig roadstead. The Swedish squadron of six ships sailed from the Hel Peninsula. The less experienced Poles immediately took the attack to the Swedish squadron, an aggressive move that surprised the Swedes. The battle then split into two separate events.

1. The Polish flagship Sankt Georg (galleon, 400t, 31 guns), supported by the smaller Meerwieb (Panna Wodna -160t, 12 guns) attacked the Swedish flagship Tigern (Tiger, 320t, 22 guns), that was commanded by Admiral Niels Stiernskold. Entangled together, the Polish marines boarded and captured the Tigern.
2. The Vice Admiral's ship of the Polish Navy, the small galleon Meerman (Wodnik, 200t, 17 guns) attacked the larger Swedish Solen (Sun, 300t, 38 guns), whose captain blew up the ship, rather than let be captured. The remaining four Swedish ships fled and escaped pursuit. Both the Polish and Swedish Admirals were killed.

== The last years of Arka Noego ==
The Polish–Swedish War of 1626–1629 ended with the truce of the Truce of Altmark (Stary Targ) that was signed on September 25, 1629. The Truce of Altmark favored the Swedes but it did return to the Poland–Lithuanian Commonwealth territories such as the southeastern region of Latgale that had been occupied since the 1625 invasion. The remainder of the Polish navy fleet was marked for transfer to Sweden. The ambitious Poland–Lithuania Confederacy King Sigismund III Vasa (English) - Zygmunt III Waza (Polish) - (June 9, 1595 – May 20, 1648 (reign 1566–1632) and the Catholic League, remained active and belligerent, particularly as Zigmund III Vasa wanted to revive his hereditary claim to the Swedish throne because he was a descendant of the House of Vasa, and had briefly been King of Sweden. The Polish flotilla sailed to Wismar, the famous Hanseatic League port, and took part in several skirmishes against the Danish and the Swedish Navies. In January 1632, Wismar was conquered by Sweden who remained in control of the city until 1903.

Reconstruction of coat of arms, Vasa kings of Poland

The Treaty of Stuhmsdorf or Sztumska Wieś, was signed on September 12, 1635, between the Polish–Lithuanian Commonwealth and King Władysław IV Vasa (son of Zigmund III Vasa) and Sweden. Essentially, it was an extension of the Truce of Altmark. Sweden was willing to give up their conquests in Prussia if Władysław IV Vasa would renounce his claim to the Swedish crown, and Sweden could retain their conquests in Livonia. The peace between Poland and Sweden was also supported by French Cardinal Richelieu Meanwhile, Zigmund III Vasa gathered a new army of about 21,000 soldiers and he sent Gdańsk (Danzig) merchant (Jerzy Ossoliński) to gather up Polish allies in non-occupied Prussia. With the help of Georg Hewel, he bought ten merchant ships to be converted into warships, and established the 'Sea Commission' (Komisja Morska) - led by Gerard Denhoff.

The Polish flotilla sailed to Wismar, the famous Hanseatic League port, and took part in several skirmishes against the Danish and the Swedish Navies. In January 1632, Wismar was conquered by Sweden who remained in control of the city until 1903. Arka Noego was seized at that time and incorporated into the Swedish navy under the name Vita Hunden. The last mention of Arka Noego dates from 1636, when the vessel was sold into private hands and the subsequent fate of the ship is unknown. Denmark destroyed the remainder of the Polish fleet in 1637 without formally declaring war.

Royal banner of Polish–Lithuanian Commonwealth, House of Vasa (1587–1668).

Coat of arms of Polish–Lithuanian Commonwealth, based upon 1597 illustration.

Polish War Jack, documented on Polish war ships in 1627.
