= Ratilio =

Lithuanian folk music and dance ensemble

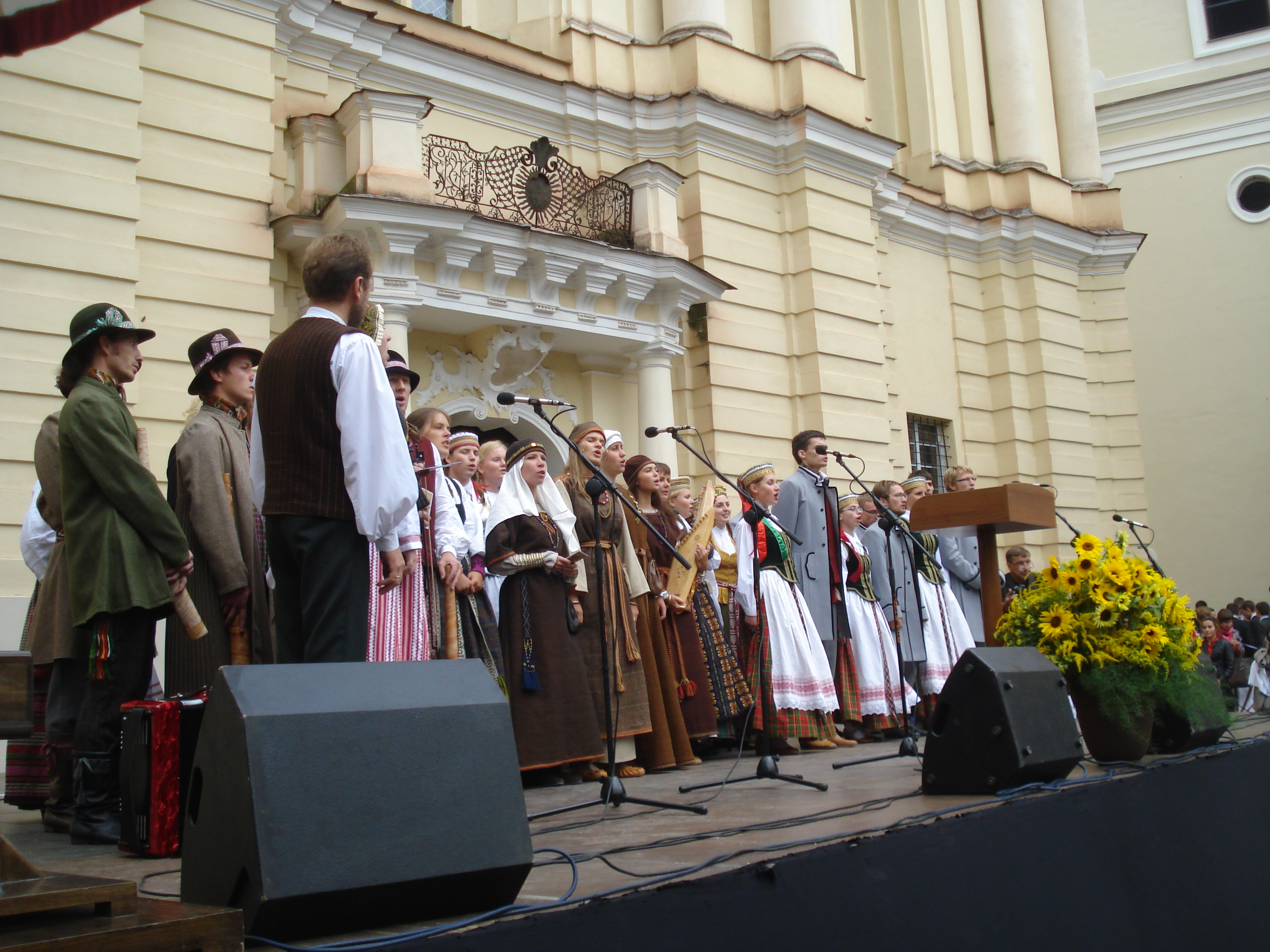

Ratilio is a Lithuanian folk music and dance ensemble associated with Vilnius University. Founded in 1968, it is one of the oldest in Lithuania.

Its members draw on their varied backgrounds during performances, which include storytelling using regional dialects. The performers follow specific regional traditions. It maintains and expands its repertoire through ongoing researches and contacts made during its international travels.

The ensemble uses traditional musical elements, including the kanklės, ragai, daudytė, skudučiai, and the multipart harmonies of the sutartinė. Its first recording was made in 1980, followed by releases in 1987, 1990, 2002 and 2013.

== Sources ==
- (in Lithuanian) Ratilio. Vilnius University. Accessed 2010-12-07.
- (in Lithuanian) Dainos ir šokiai suvienija kartas. Delfi.lt. April 2, 2008. Accessed 2010-12-07.
