= Ritter Sankt Georg =

17th-century Polish warship

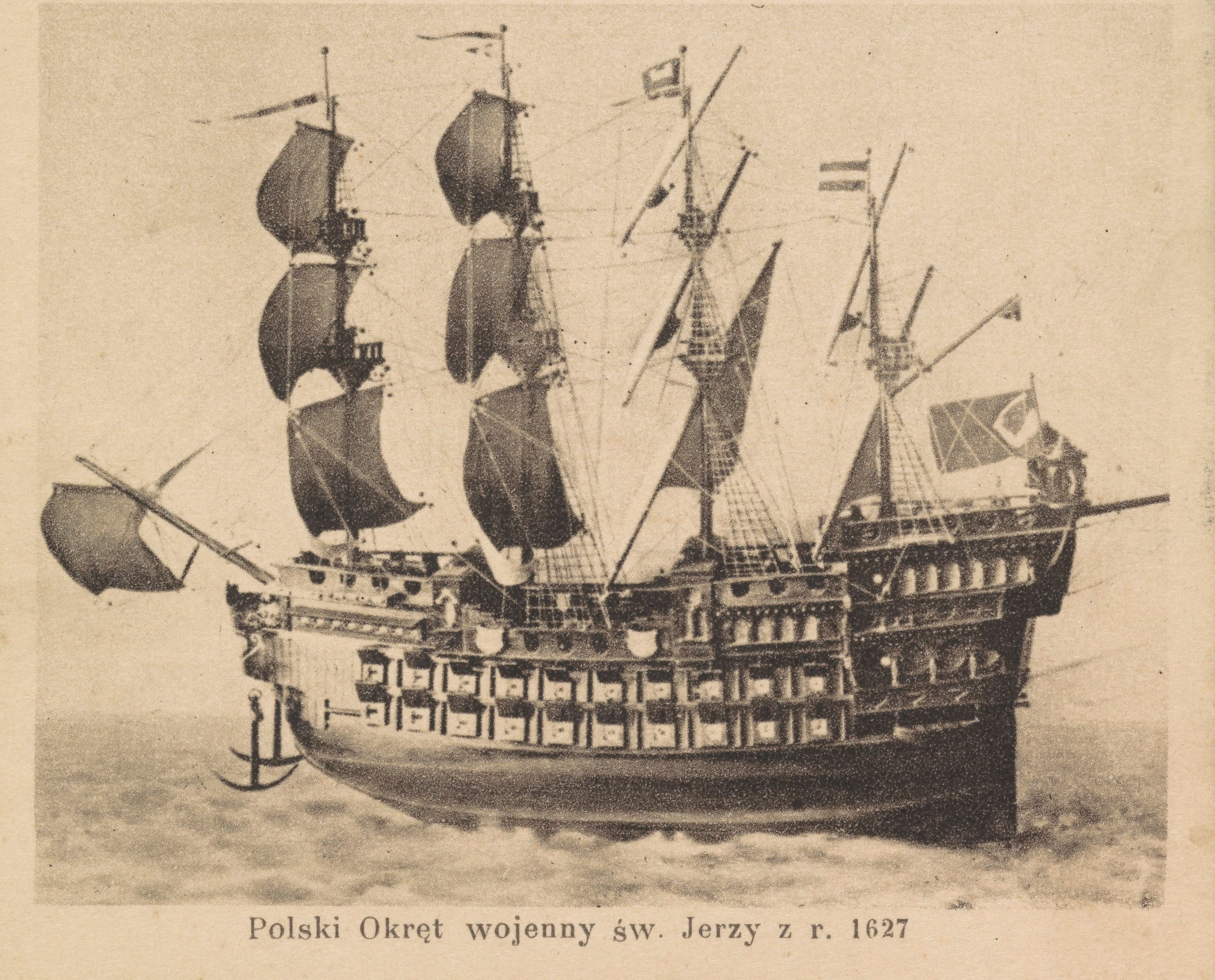
- Inaccurate model of Ritter Sankt Georg, 1925

History

Polish–Lithuanian Commonwealth Navy
- Name: Ritter Sankt Georg
- Laid down: 1625
- Launched: 1627
- Fate: Burnt on 6 July 1628

General characteristics
- Length: c. 24 m
- Propulsion: Sails
- Crew: 50 sailors, 100 soldiers
- Armament: 31 guns

Ritter Sankt Georg, (Note: German: [ˈʁɪtɐ zaŋkt ˈɡeː.ɔrk]; Polish: Rycerz Święty Jerzy; translation to English: Knight Saint George) also known as Sankt Georg, (Note: Polish: Święty Jerzy; translation to English: Saint George) was a 31-gun galleon of the Polish–Lithuanian Commonwealth Navy. Launched in Puck, Poland in 1627, she fought in the Battle of Oliwa before being destroyed by Swedish artillery fire in 1628.

== Name ==
The ship is referred to in the German-language sources as Ritter Sankt Georg, or more simply as Sankt Georg, which, respectively, mean Knight of Saint George, and Saint George. The Polish-language name that was used for the ship in the 17th century remains unknown, however, the ship is retroactively referred to as Rycerz Święty Jerzy and Święty Jerzy, in modern Polish-language sources, which is a direct translation of the German name.

== History ==
The ship was made in the town of Puck, Poland and her construction lasted from 1625 to 1627. After her launch, Ritter Sankt Georg served in the Polish–Lithuanian Commonwealth Navy.

She was the flagship of the Polish–Lithuanian fleet which fought in the Battle of Oliwa during Polish–Swedish War on 28 November 1627. Ritter Sankt Georg was commanded by Admiral Arend Dickmann, while Hieronim Teschke was the skipper. Onboard was also Captain Jan Storch who commanded the ship's marines. During the battle, Ritter Sankt Georg attacked and boarded the Swedish flagship Tigern. The fight ended with the crew of Ritter Sankt Georg capturing Tigern. Ritter Sankt Georg also fired several broadsides at the Swedish galleon Pelikanen. Dickmann died at the end of the battle aboard Tigern, being hit with stray round shot that was probably fired from Pelikanen or friendly fire from Fliegender Hirsch. Ritter Sankt Georg itself sustained the damages in the battle, including being hit three times under the waterline.

On 2 May 1628, Teschke become the new captain of the ship. Over a month later on 5 July 1628, several Polish-Lithuanian warships were attacked by Swedish artillery batteries near the Wisłoujście Fortress on the Martwa Wisła river. After midnight, on 6 July, Ritter Sankt Georg became stuck on the backshore. Before she managed to free herself, the ship was seriously damaged by Swedish artillery fire. The crew abandoned the ship in the early morning, following which, she was burnt by the artillery fire. Teschke died during the engagement. The rest of the Polish-Lithuanian ships retreated up the river, with the exception of Gelber Löwe which was also destroyed in the battle.

== Specifications ==
The ship was a galleon with the length of a hull between the stems being around 24 m (120 Amsterdam feet) and the width of the hull is 7.4 m (26 Amsterdam feet). It had a cargo capacity of around 400 tones (200 lasts). The ship had 31 cannons of various caliber at the broadside. Its crew counted 50 sailors and 100 marines.

== Citations ==
=== Bibliography ===
- J. Pertek: Polacy na morzach i oceanach, vol. 1, Poznań: Wydaw. Poznańskie, 1981, ISBN 83-210-0141-6, OCLC 749548852.
- Maciej Flis: Twierdza Wisłoujście. In: Muzeum Gdańska. Przewodnik ilustrowany. Warsaw: Foto Liner, 2018. ISBN 978-83-62559-29-9.
