= Sztumska Wieś =

- Village
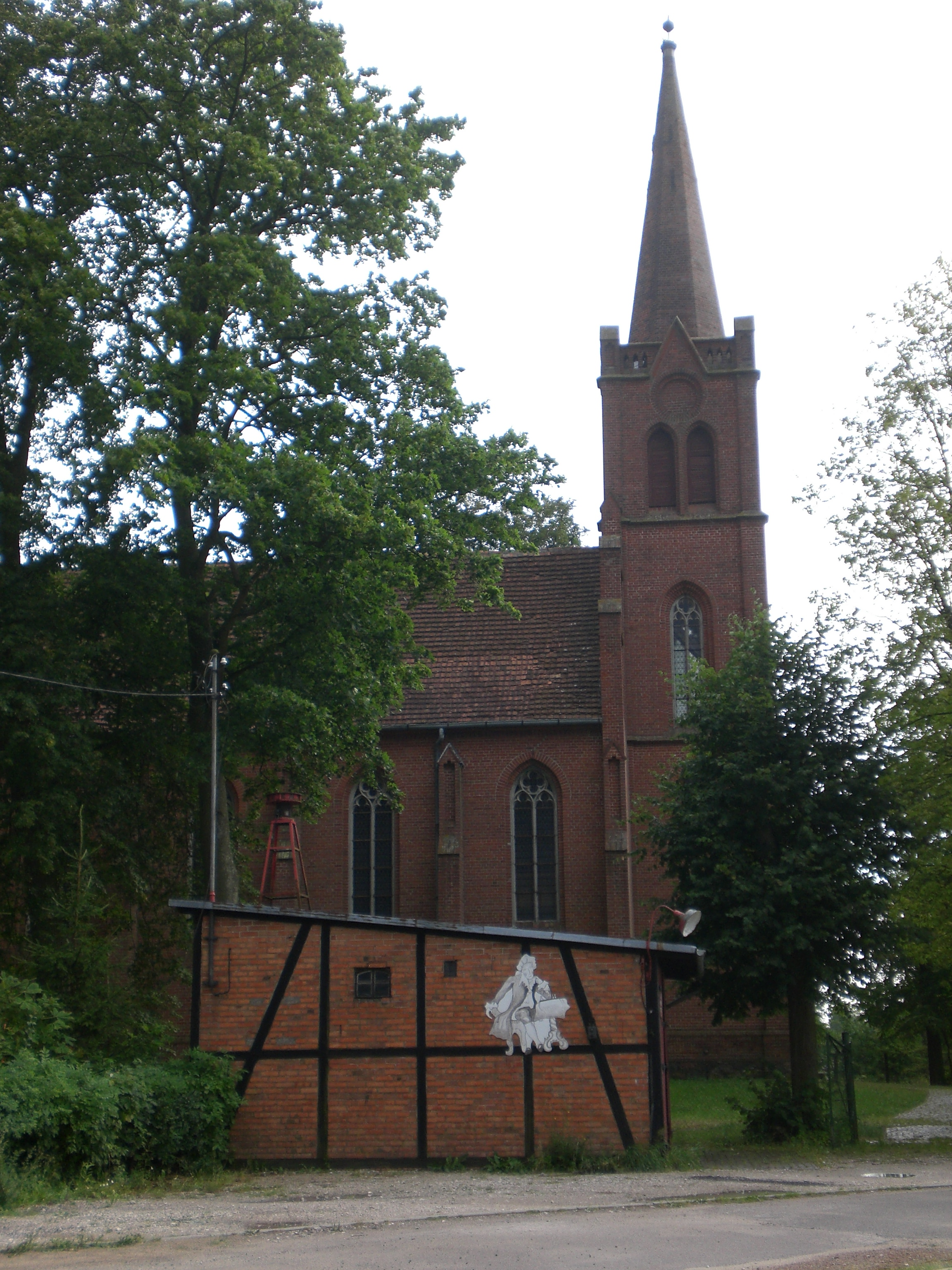
- Church of the Exaltation of the Holy Cross

- Location within Poland
- Coordinates: 53°53′36″N 19°0′37″E
- Country: Poland
- Voivodeship: Pomeranian
- County: Sztum
- Gmina: Sztum

Population
  - Total: 500
- Time zone: UTC+1 (CET)
  - Summer (DST): UTC+2 (CEST)
- Vehicle registration: GSZ

Sztumska Wieś [ˈʂtumska ˈvjɛɕ] is a village in the administrative district of Gmina Sztum, within Sztum County, Pomeranian Voivodeship, in northern Poland. It is located in the region of Powiśle.

== History ==
Sztumska Wieś was a royal village in the Malbork Voivodeship of the Kingdom of Poland. The Treaty of Stuhmsdorf between the Polish–Lithuanian Commonwealth and Sweden was signed in the village in 1635. The treaty is commemorated by a memorial stone in Sztumska Wieś.
