= Battle of Oliwa =

1627 naval battle during the Polish–Swedish War

- Part of the Polish–Swedish War (1626–1629)
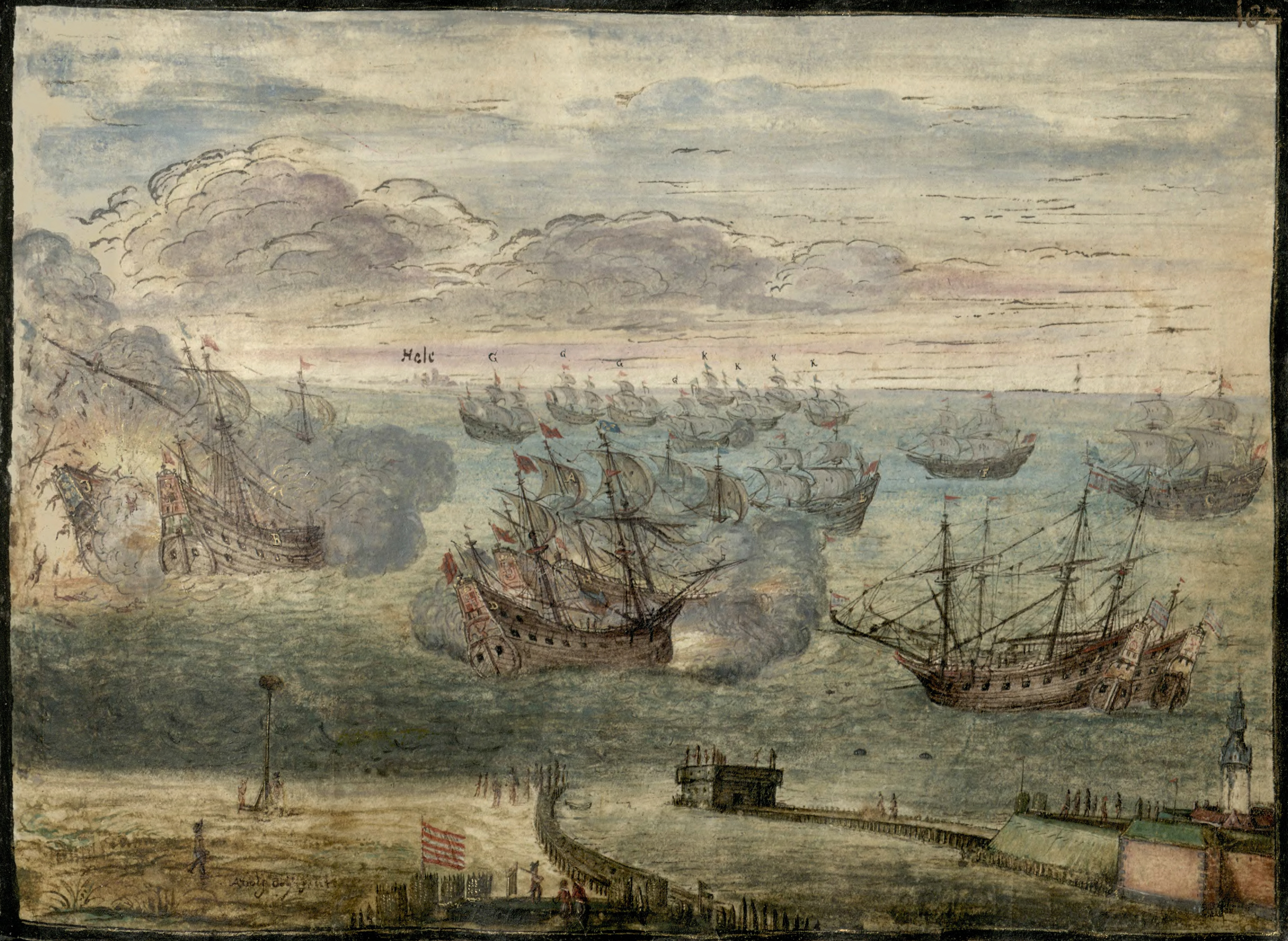
- 1638 painting of the battle
| Date | 28 November 1627 |
| Location | Off Gdańsk, Baltic Sea |
| Result | Polish–Lithuanian victory |

Belligerents
| Poland–Lithuania | Sweden |

Commanders and leaders
| Arend Dickmann † | Nils Stiernsköld † |

Strength
| 4 galleons 3 full-rigged pinnaces 3 fluyts | 5 galleons 1 full-rigged pinnace |

Casualties and losses
| 47 killed or wounded | 304 killed or wounded 68 captured 1 galleon destroyed 1 galleon captured |

Flag of the Polish–Lithuanian Commonwealth Navy in the 17th century.

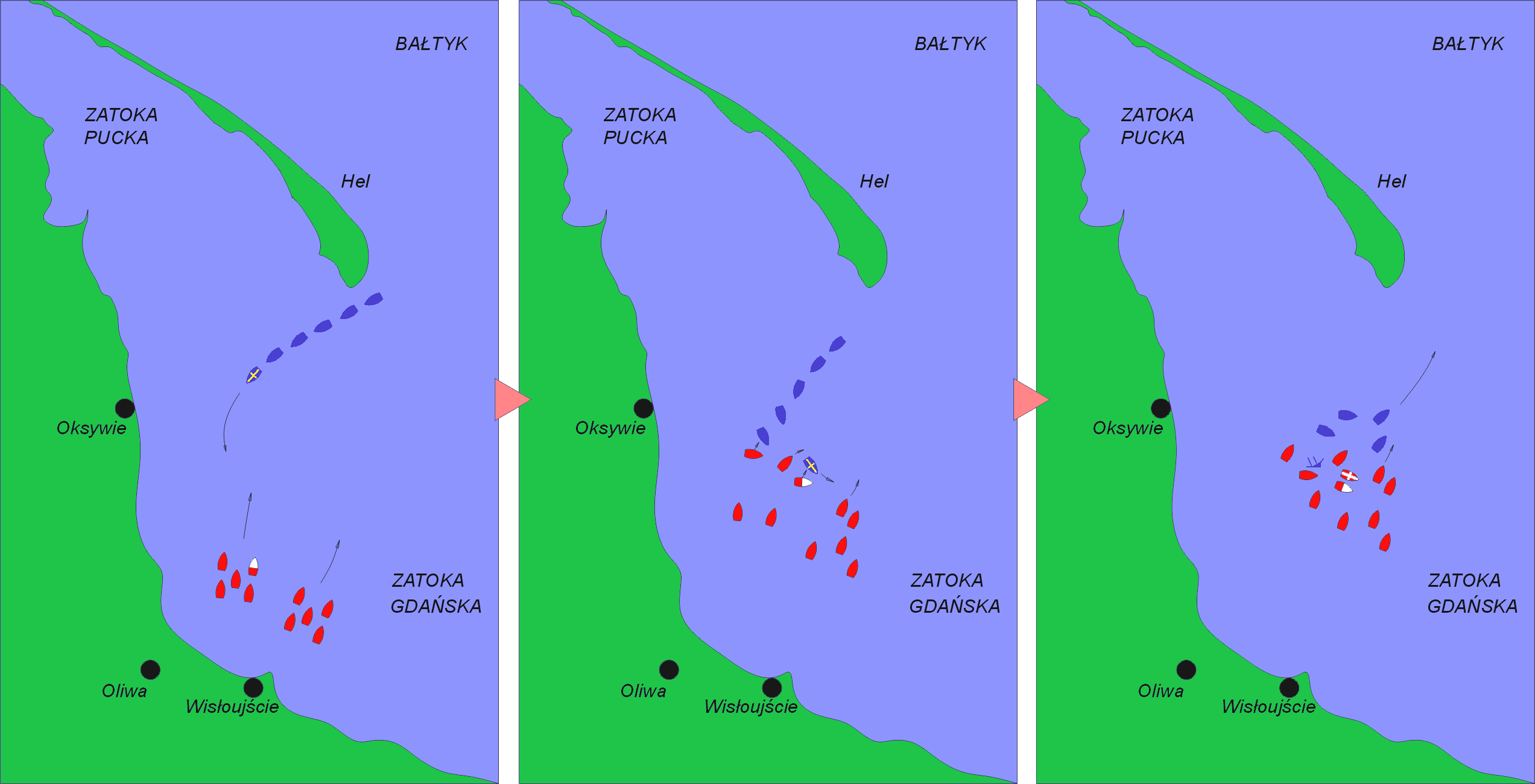
Course of the battle.

The Battle of Oliwa, also known as the Battle of Oliva or the Battle of Gdańsk Roadstead, was a naval battle that took place on 28 November, 1627, slightly north of the port of Danzig (Gdańsk) off of the coast of the village of Oliva during the Polish–Swedish War. It was the largest naval engagement to be fought by the Polish–Lithuanian Commonwealth Navy and resulted in defeating a Swedish squadron led by Niels Stiernsköld that conducted a blockade of the harbour of Gdańsk. The Poles sailed out of the Danzig harbour and engaged the Swedish squadron capturing the Swedish flagship and sinking another Swedish warship.

== Background ==
The Swedes had a long tradition of seamanship and maintained a strong navy, and were able to land troops from the Swedish mainland at will along the southern Baltic shore. They were also able to blockade the Polish–Lithuanian Commonwealth's ports (most important being Danzig) maintaining a stranglehold on Polish-Lithuanian trade. On 28 November, a small, newly-formed Polish–Lithuanian Commonwealth fleet, using purchased German ships and foreign (mainly Dutch) sailors, emerged from Danzig to defeat the Swedish blockading squadron. The admiral of the Polish fleet (at the time) was Wilhelm Appelmann, but due to illness, he could not take part in the battle and the royal commissioners appointed a new admiral of the Polish fleet before the battle. Arend Dickmann made himself the admiral of the fleet, Jan Storch made himself the commander of the Polish marines, and Herman Witte made himself the vice admiral. These three commanders formed a council of war in which they jointly developed a battle plan and decided on the attack. The galleon Ritter Sankt Georg was the Polish-Lithuanian flagship.

== Battle ==
The Polish–Lithuanian fleet outnumbered the blockading Swedish squadron; the two Polish-Lithuanian squadrons numbered ten ships in all, but most were of small size, and only four Polish-Lithuanian ships were at full combat strength. The Polish–Lithuanian ships were commanded by Admiral Arend Dickmann in the Ritter Sankt Georg. The Swedish squadron numbered six vessels under Admiral Nils Stiernsköld in his flagship, Tigern. The Polish–Lithuanian ships had a larger complement of marines on board than the Swedish ships, and this in large part determined the tactics employed in the battle.

The Polish–Lithuanian fleet anchored off the Danzig roadstead, while the Swedish squadron sailed southwards from the Hel Peninsula. The Polish–Lithuanian squadrons weighed anchor and suddenly rushed towards the Swedish squadron, much to the surprise of the Swedes.

The battle split into two main encounters. The Polish–Lithuanian flagship Ritter Sankt Georg, supported by the Meerweib, engaged the Swedish flagship Tigern. More Polish–Lithuanian ships came alongside the Tigern and Polish–Lithuanian marines boarded, overwhelmed the Swedes, and captured the vessel. Meanwhile, the Polish–Lithuanian vice-admiral's galleon, Meermann, attacked the larger Swedish galleon, Solen. The captain of the Solen, a Scotsman named Alexander Forath who served as the vice admiral of the fleet, seeing that his ship was about to be captured, detonated the powder magazine and blew his ship up rather than let it be captured. The four surviving Swedish ships realized their situation, quickly headed towards the open sea, and managed to escape the pursuit. Both admirals were killed.

After the conclusion of the battle, Arend Dickmann (known to the Poles as the Polish Nelson) died from a cannon shot that smashed his legs and appeared to be fired from the retreating Swedish ships, while the Swedish admiral Nils Stiernsköld soon died of injuries sustained during the fighting. Both admirals were buried with the highest honors in the St. Mary's Basilica in Danzig.

== Aftermath ==
The after action report on the battle for Sigismund III Vasa was prepared by Wolfgang von der Oelsnitz from the Royal Ship Commission, who also presented the king with the captured Swedish flags and the personal sword of Nils Stiernsköld. James Murray was dismissed from duty after the conclusion of the battle after allegations of cowardice surfaced from the other captains of the Polish–Lithuanian fleet over the refusal of Murray to pursue the fleeing of the Swedish ships.

The immediate effect of the battle was the temporary removal of the Swedish blockade of Danzig. The court of the Polish–Lithuanian Commonwealth used the victory to the maximum advantage in their propaganda. A popular Polish saying states that on that day "the sun went down at noon", referring to the destruction of one of the Swedish ships, the Solen. Gustavus received the news of this battle with some mark of impatience, and apparently little awareness of the difference between naval and land operations – he could not help expressing his surprise that a "city of merchants" (referring to the city of Danzig) should be able to dispute the sea with a professional navy.

== Order of battle ==
=== Ships of the Polish–Lithuanian Commonwealth Navy ===
- 1st Squadron
  - Ritter Sankt Georg (Rycerz Święty Jerzy) ("Knight St George") – flagship, galleon, 31 guns, 400 tons, under the command of Arend Dickmann
  - Fliegender Hirsch (Latający Jeleń) ("Flying Deer") – galleon, 20 guns, 300 tons, under the command of Ellert Appelman
  - Meerweib (Panna Wodna) ("Sea Virgo") – full-rigged pinnace, 12 guns, 160 tons, under the command of Adolf von Arzen
  - Schwarzer Rabe (Czarny Kruk) ("Black Raven") – fluyt, 16 guns, 260 tons, under the command of Alexander Bley
  - Gelber Löwe (Żółty Lew) ("Yellow Lion") – full-rigged pinnace, 10 guns, 120 tons, under the command of Hans Kizer
- 2nd Squadron
  - Meermann (Wodnik) ("Aquarius") – galleon, 17 guns, 200 tons, under the command of Hermann Witte
  - König David (Król Dawid) ("King David") – galleon, 31 guns, 400 tons, under James Murray
  - Arche Noah (Arka Noego) ("Noah's Ark") – full-rigged pinnace, 16 guns, 180 tons, under the command of Magnus Wesman
  - Weißer Löwe (Biały Lew) ("White Lion") – fluyt, 8 guns, 200 tons, under the command of Peter Böse
  - Feuerblase (Płomień) ("Fireblaze") – fluyt, 18 guns, 240 tons

In total, the fleet consisted of 10 ships, 179 cannons and 1,160 soldiers and sailors.

=== Ships of the Swedish Navy ===
- Tigern ("Tiger") – flagship, galleon, 22 guns, 320 tons, under the command of Nils Stiernsköld – captured by the Polish-Lithuanians
- Solen ("Sun") – galleon, 38 guns, 300 tons – under the command of Alexander Forath – blown up
- Pelikanen ("Pelican") – galleon, 20 guns, 200 tons – escaped
- Månen ("Moon") – galleon, 26 guns, 300 tons – escaped
- Enhörningen ("Unicorn") – galleon, 18 guns, 240 tons – escaped
- Papegojan ("Parrot") – full-rigged pinnace, 16 guns, 180 tons – escaped

In total, the fleet consisted of 6 ships, 140 cannons and 700 soldiers and sailors.

== Commemoration ==
- The Battle of Oliwa was commemorated in 1990 on the Tomb of the Unknown Soldier in Warsaw, by an inscription on one of the boards that states "OLIWA 28 XI 1627".
- In Gdańsk, there are streets named after the battle and Arend Dickmann himself, in recognition of his naval victory.
- A monument was constructed in Oliwa to celebrate the battle.
- Another monument to celebrate the battle was constructed in Gdynia, but it was destroyed in 1939 by the Germans after they captured Gdynia during the German invasion of Poland.
- On 28 November, 1918 (which was also the anniversary of the Battle of Oliwa), the Polish Chief of State Józef Piłsudski ordered the creation of the Polish Navy.

== Bibliography ==
- Podhorodecki L., Rapiers and Horsemen, (1985), ISBN 83-05-11452-X
- The Little Military Encyclopedia, Edition I, (1967)
- Eugeniusz Koczorowski, The Battle of Oliwa, Gdańsk Sea Publishing House, Edition II, (1976)

== See also ==
- Battle of Vistula Lagoon
- Polish–Lithuanian Commonwealth Navy
- List of naval battles
- Military history
- History of Poland
