= Fryderyk Getkant =

German cartographer

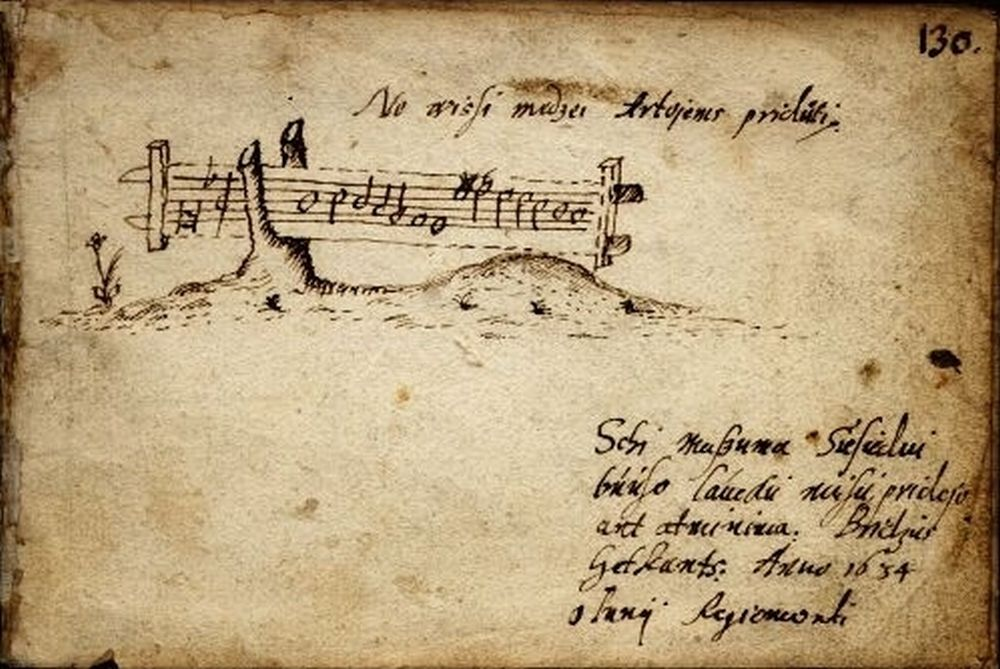
First Lithuanian folk song written down along with melody by Fryderyk Getkant in 1634. Signed in Lithuanian as Bridžius Getkants.

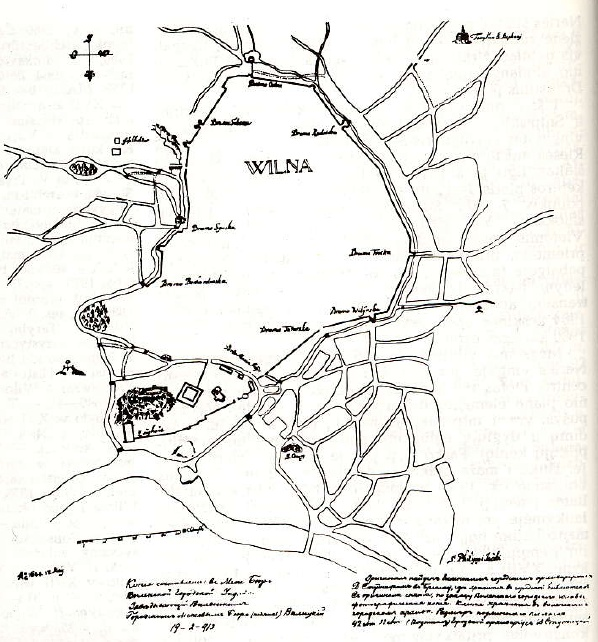
Map of the wall surrounding Vilnius in 1648

Fryderyk Getkant or Frederick Getkant (German: Friedrich Getkant, Latin: Fridericus Getkant, Lithuanian: Frydrichas (Bridžius) Gedkantas) (1600 – 1666) was a Prussian military engineer of Lithuanian descent, artillery lieutenant and cartographer. He was born in Ragnit or according to other sources in Rhineland, Holy Roman Empire. He is also known as a first to have written down a Lithuanian folk song with melody, in 1634.

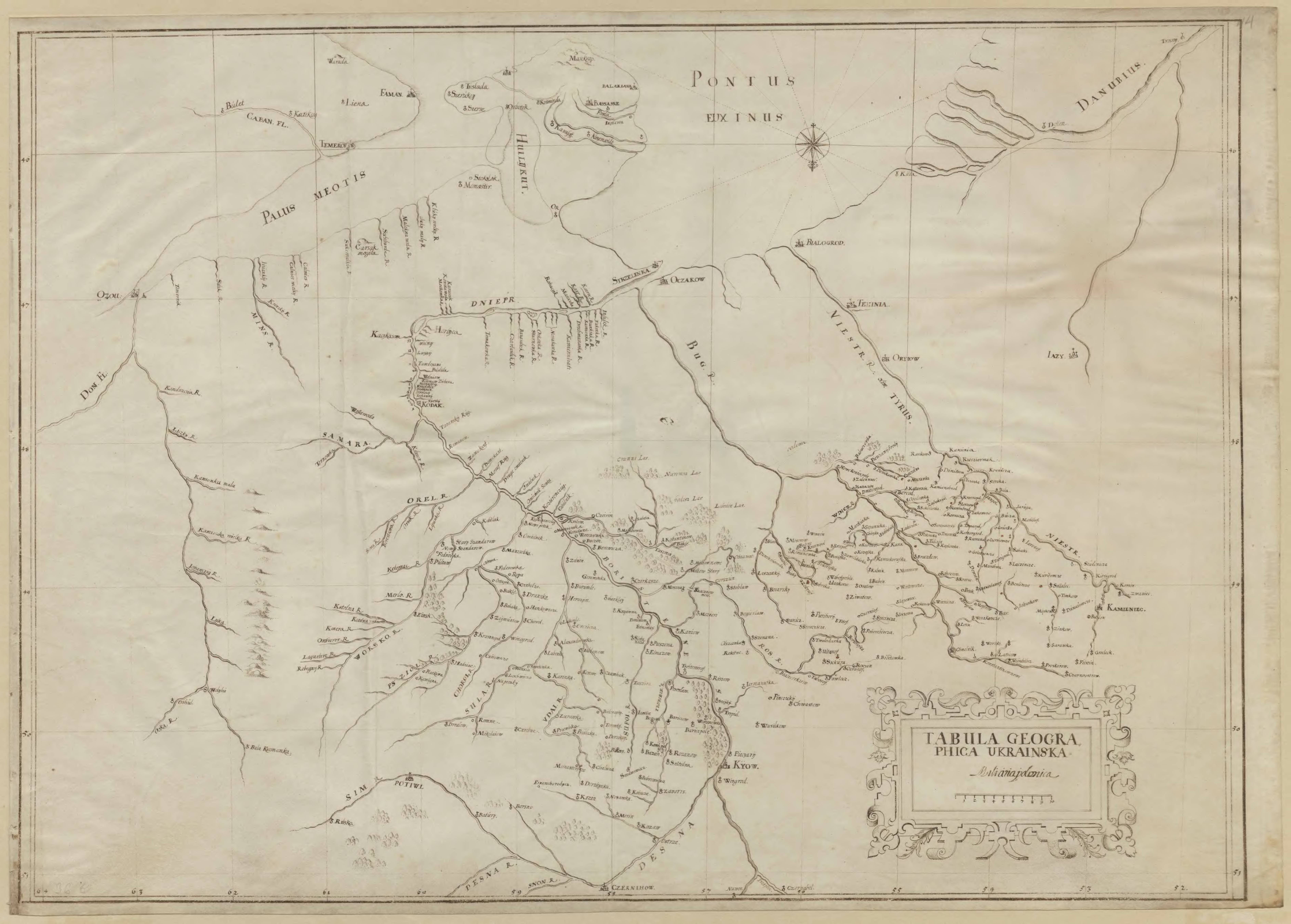
A map of Ukraine drawn by Fryderyk Getkant sometime between 1634-1639

From the 1620s he worked in Pomeranian Voivodeship – Polish–Lithuanian Commonwealth, on the problems of defence, especially those related to King Władysław IV Vasa's short-time maritime interests (Polish–Lithuanian Commonwealth Navy).

He was one of the engineers working on fortifications in Großendorf (Władysławowo) and at Hela where Pomerania and Royal Prussia meet, (now Hel Peninsula) together with Johann Pleitner.

Under the threat of Russian military invasion Getkant organised reconstruction of Vilnius military objects. He also prepared city plans for Kaunas, Tauragė and Virbalis.

Author of many plans, maps and atlases (especially of the lands near the Baltic Sea), among them, manuscript atlas of 15 military maps of grand fortresses and fortifications – Topographia practica conscripta et recognita per Fridericum Getkant, mechanicum (1638). Manuscript of his work covering mechanical and engineering aspects of his work was lost during the Lwów fire in 1662.

== See also ==
- Eliasz Arciszewski
- Krzysztof Arciszewski
- Ernest Braun
- Kazimierz Siemienowicz
