= Solen (ship) =

17th-century galleon ship

Solen was a Swedish 17th-century galleon ship, sunk during the battle with the Polish squadron at Oliwa on November 28, 1627.

== History ==
The galeon Solen was classified in Sweden as the lagom örlogskepp – a medium-sized ship. It belonged to a group of nine vessels ordered in 1623 by the Swedes in the Netherlands (among which was also the Tigern). She entered the Swedish service in 1624. She was converted into a warship and armed in Alvsborg. Originally, until 1626 it was part of the Swedish fleet in the west sea, in the waters of the Kattegat. During the Polish-Swedish War, Solen was part of the Swedish forces blocking the Bay of Gdansk. The ship's commander was Alexander Foratth.

Solen with the other ships of the Swedish squadron took part in the battle against the Polish fleet at Oliwa on November 28, 1627. Mistaken for the Vice Admiral's ship, "Solen was attacked and murdered by the Polish smaller galleon Wodnik. During hand-to-hand combat and gunfire, among others, Captain Foratt was killed. When the fight started to take an unfavorable turn for the Swedes, the Swedish skipper blew up Solen, setting fire to the powder chamber in the bow and causing the explosion of gunpowder and immediate sinking of the ship. 46 crew members, taken prisoner by Poles, survived.

In the report published after the battle there was a saying, referring to the name of the ship, that on that day, near Gdańsk, the Sun went down at noon.

== Wreck ==
On October 20, 1969, during work on the construction of the Northern Port of Gdansk, the remains of a sailing shipwreck were found, which was later identified with a high probability as Solen and marked as W-6. The bottom part, however, without the bow, covered with stones used on the galleon as ballast, has been preserved. The wreck lay at a depth of 16 meters, 3 nautical miles northeast of the entrance to the port of Gdansk, at the position 54°28' north width and 18°42' east length. The wreck was then explored by the National Maritime Museum in Gdansk, a pioneering work in Poland at the time.

Eleven barrels of cannons were extracted from the wreck in 1969, eight of which were cast in Sweden (signed with a sheaf – the Vasa coat of arms), two were Polish and one was Russian, probably captured earlier by the Swedes. Then the wreck was dug up and the area was searched using ejectors and electricity generators. Over the following years, more than 6,000 items were excavated, such as nine more cannons, cannonballs, powder shovels, muskets, ramrods, and musket supports, tin dishes, ceramics, Swedish coins, one sculpture depicting a man's head, pieces of clothing and small utility items. In 1975 the removal of ballast stones from the wreck began, weighing from several to several dozen kilograms. Due to the location of the wreck on the approach to the port, on September 10, 1980, the wreck was moved to another place, in the area of Gdynia-Orłowo by means of a floating crane Smok. The research of the W-6 position was completed in 1981. The exhibits excavated from "Solen" are located in the Central Maritime Museum in Gdansk. The 20 cannons found were cast in the period from 1560 to the second decade of the 17th century.
