= Polish–Lithuanian Commonwealth Navy =

Navy of the Polish–Lithuanian Commonwealth

Naval Jack of the Polish–Lithuanian Commonwealth Navy in the 17th century

Polish–Lithuanian Commonwealth Navy was the navy of the Polish–Lithuanian Commonwealth and existed from 1627 to 1643.

== History ==
The Commonwealth Navy was small and played a relatively minor role in the history of the Commonwealth. Despite having access to the Baltic Sea and temporarily to the Black Sea, neither Poland nor Lithuania had any significant navy until the first naval commission was established by Sigismund II Augustus during the Northern Seven Years' War in 1568.

=== Sigismund III Vasa's plans for fleet creation ===
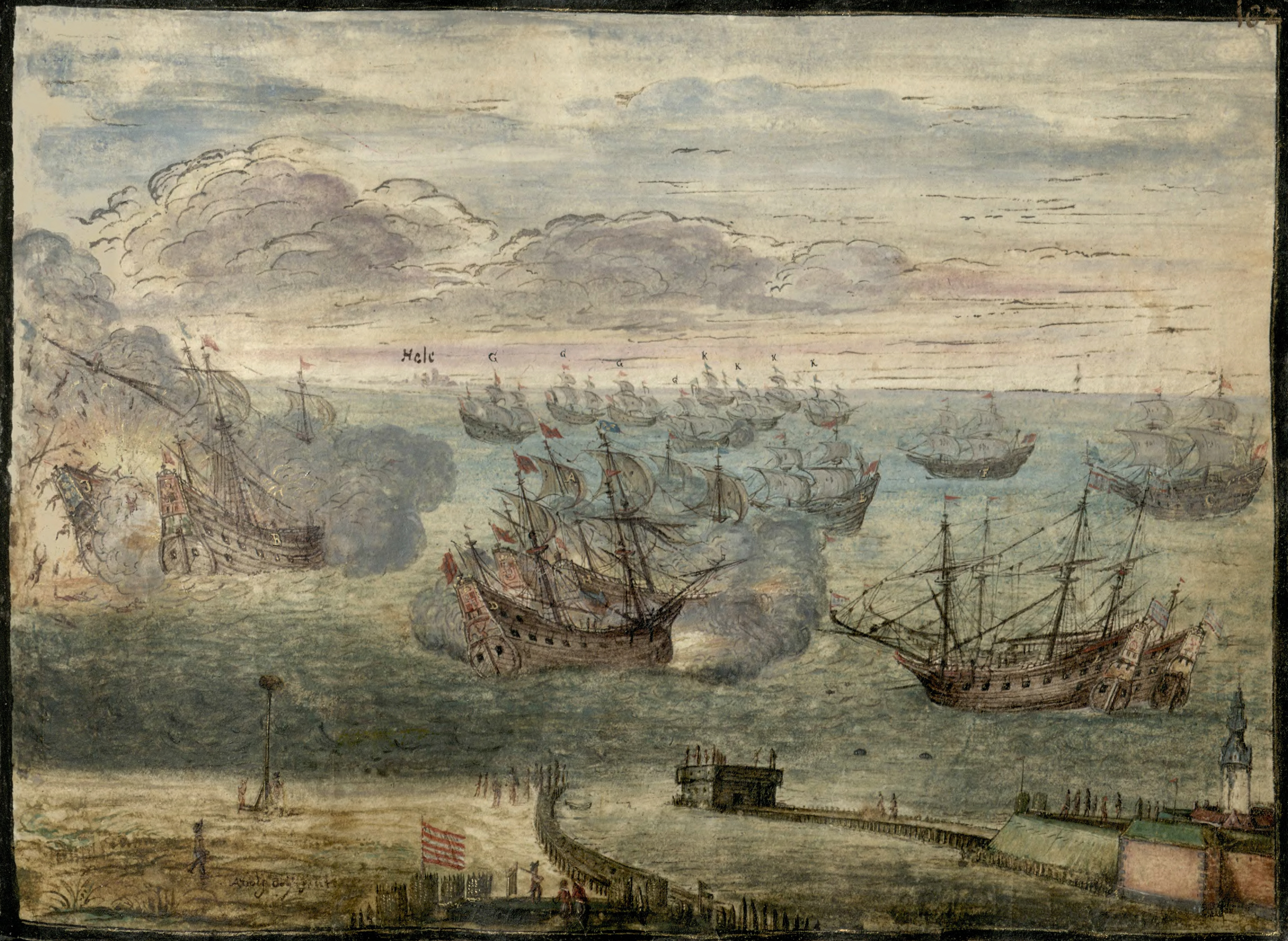
The Battle of Oliwa, fought 28 November 1627

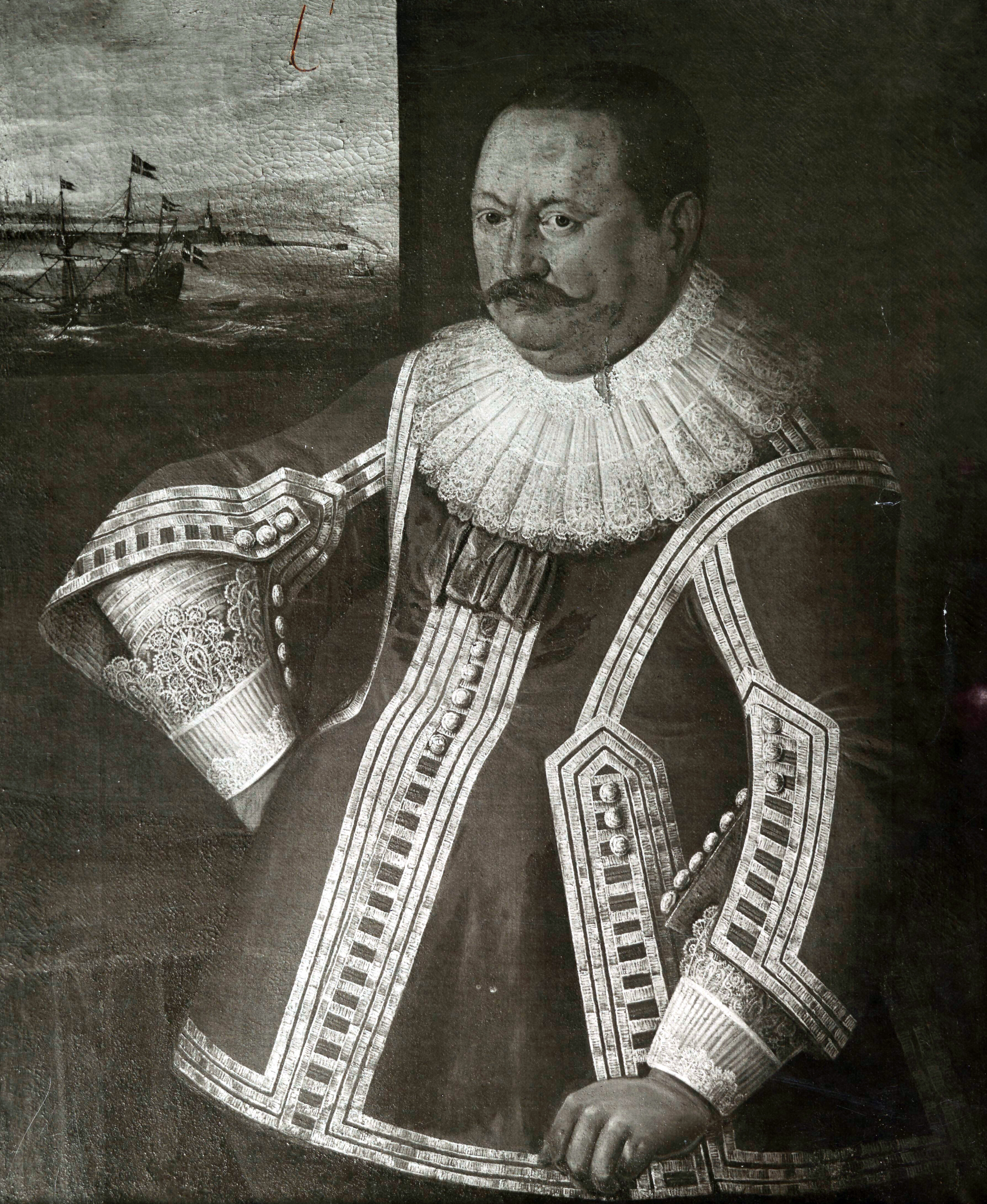
Arend Dickmann, who commanded the Polish–Lithuanian fleet at the Battle of Oliwa

At the turn of the seventeenth century, Poland became ruled by the House of Vasa, and was involved in a series of wars with Sweden (see also dominium maris baltici). Vasa kings attempted to create a proper fleet, but their attempts met with repeated failures, due to lack of funds in the royal treasury; the Polish nobility saw little need for the fleet and refused to raise taxes for its construction, and Gdańsk continued its opposition to the idea of a royal fleet. During the reign of Sigismund III, the most celebrated victory of the Commonwealth Navy under command of Admiral Arend Dickmann took place at the Battle of Oliwa in 1627 against Sweden, during the Polish-Swedish War. The victory over Sweden secured for Poland permanent access to the Atlantic, and laid the foundations for expeditions beyond Europe.

The plans for the independent fleet fell through shortly afterwards due to a badly executed alliance with the Habsburgs who on February 8, 1629, took over the Polish-Lithuanian fleet after negotiations, since 1627, between Gabriel Posse (representant of Polish–Lithuanian Commonwealth) and Gabriel de Roy (representant of Spanish Empire) to make a Catholic Fleet with the mission to control the Baltic Sea from Aalborg, Kołobrzeg, Rostock, Friedrichstadt and Wismar (territories occupied by HRE's Admiral of the Baltic Sea, Albrecht von Wallenstein, ally of Spain) against the Protestant navies of Northern Europe, which were their common enemies at the time. This provocated a minor Polish intervention in the Thirty Years' War to help Spanish Netherlands against Denmark–Norway, England and Dutch Republic (planning to open a new front on the Eighty Years' War), in exchange for a promised Habsburg Spain's help against Sweden (agreeing that the Poles would then take over the Flanders navy and receive Spanish technical advice to their naval industry). The Polish ships, sent to Wismar, were much better equipped than the imperial ones, being Król Dawid their flagship, and even frightened Gustavus Adolphus of its potential if Wallenstein added his ships under construction or developed another separate Spanish Baltic Fleet, but some unforeseen problems arose as the Polish-Lithuanian crews refused to sail unless they were paid in advance, as many were river peasants (Kashubians and Flisacos of Vistula) who were used to plundering the coasts that the Swedes blocked, but the expedition to Wismar seemed useless and incomprehensible to them. Also, internal conflicts of interests and leadership between Spain, Holy Roman Emperor, Catholic League and Wallenstein, as the effects of the Spanish Bankrupt of 1627, prevented this Spanish-Polish fleet from having any relevant operations, being relegated to fighting the Danish and Swedish fleets in very small sporadic skirmishes, and their mission lost part of his proposal after Peace of Lübeck on 22 May 1629 (when Denmark quits from the War), as Spain wasn't really interested to fight against Swedes for Poland, just to divert the Dutch army in helping Danes in Germany while diverting forces at Belgium, and also get German ground military aid from Catholic League to fight in Netherlands or Italy against Dutch and France in exchange for Spanish support against Denmark (Spanish aid to Poland was conditioned on maintaining Danish conflict in Baltic Sea or avoiding Swedish intervention to Germany, so Austrian Habsburg would be free to help Spain by land). However, that Polish-Lithuanian fleet in Northern Germany provocated that Danes attacked Gdańsk and destroyed their naval industry on 1629, while the 10 Polish-Lithuanian ships on Spanish service were captured in 1632 during the Swedish intervention in the Thirty Years' War. Sigismund III and later Władysław IV, demanded compensation from Philip IV for some years for his lost fleet.

The Commission of Royal Ships (Komisja Okrętów Królewskich) was created in 1625. This commission, along with the ultimate allocation of funds by the Sejm in 1637, attempted to create a permanent Commonwealth Navy. Władysław IV Waza who took the throne in 1632 bought 12 ships, and built a dedicated port for the royal navy (Władysławowo).

=== Władysław IV and plans for Navy expansion ===
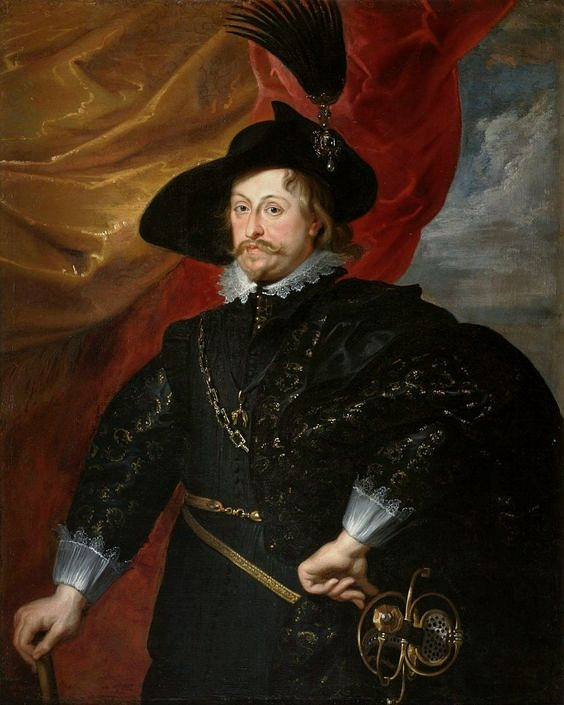
Władysław IV Vasa, by Rubens.

The 58th article signed and sworn by king Władysław IV Pacta conventa announced creation of a war fleet "according to needs of Commonwealth". Władysław, taking the throne after his father Sigismund III Vasa died in 1632, was in favour of expanding and modernising the Commonwealth military. One of his plans was the expansion of the Commonwealth Navy.

Despite his attempts he did not recover ships taken by Swedes in Wismar and Travemuende. Władysław decided to build a new fleet and created a "Naval Commission" with Gerard Denhoff as a chairman to fulfill this task. The choice of other members of this commission was not random, it contained wealthy king supporters, like the merchant and owner of a merchant fleet from Danzig, Georg Hewel (Gdańsk, Jerzy Hewel). Because the Sejm (Polish Diet) was at best reluctant to pay for new ships and royal chest was permanently empty it was due to Hewel that the new fleet was created at all. He gave to the king's disposal 10 ships, a few of them were carrying small caliber cannons. These ships had to be modernized in order to allow them to carry heavier cannons. Additionally the king wanted to build a few galleons in Gdańsk and Puck and because of long construction times, also to purchase a few ships abroad, but those plans were not realized (except of purchase of one Danish ship - requiring quite serious repair).

Thus the new 'Polish fleet' consisted of 10 ex-merchant ships: "Czarny Orzeł" (Black Eagle – 420 tons, 32 cannons), "Prorok Samuel" (Prophet Samuel – 400 tons, 24 cannons), "Wielkie Słońce" (Great Sun – 540 tons, 24 cannons), "Nowy Czarny Orzeł" (New Black Eagle – 24 cannons). Four smaller ships "Biały Orzeł" (White Eagle), "Charitas", "Gwiazda" (Star) and "Strzelec" (Saggitarius) had 200 tons and two the smallest "Święty Piotr" (Saint Peter) or "Fortuna" (Fortune) 160 tons and "Mały Biały Orzeł" (Small White Eagle) 140 tons and 4 small caliber cannons and additionally one small galley. Command of the newly created fleet was given to rear admiral Aleksander Seton.

The King did not forget to ensure a safe base for the newly created fleet. The Harbor in Puck was too shallow for the biggest ships and the usage of Wisłoujście (a fortress near Gdansk) was constantly plagued by difficulties from the Danzig Patricians (afraid that a king with a strong naval arm would step upon their "liberties", control tolls, exert taxes etc.). The royal engineers Friederich Getkant (Fryderyk Getkant), Jan Pleitner and Eliasz Arciszewski selected a location for two new fortifications with naval bases on the Hel Peninsula. They were quite impressive and raised in record time (finished in 1634, consisting of strong wooden (oak) palisades, earthen walls, trenches and moats). These fortifications were named after the King and his brother: Władysławowo and Kazimierzowo (the small town of Władysławowo still exists on the Hel Peninsula - the fort was more or less on its current edge).

Additionally about 500 Cossacks under Konstanty Kołek with their small boats (Chaika) were brought. It is uncertain if they were used at all. Their main goal was to plague Swedish communication and supply lines near Piława (now Baltiysk in Kaliningrad Oblast) and on Zatoka Wiślana (Vistula Bay). There were plans to use Cossacks in their light but very fast boats against Inflanty (Livonia) and even to raid the Swedish shore (to burn, pillage, capture merchant ships etc.). Cossacks were known from their plundering raids on Black Sea (they even burned suburbs of Istanbul once or twice). Because of the overall tonnage and armament difference between Polish and Swedish naval fleets even before (in 1620s), the main role of the Polish fleet was to disrupt Swedish communication and supply lines, to capture merchant ships bringing supplies for the Swedes.

The king's plan never had strong support from Polish nobles (szlachta): high costs and reluctance to strengthen the king's power were always crippling Władysław's plans. Thus not even all the king's expenses for the modernization of those ten ships were fully repaid. Unfortunate international alliances (with Denmark and Muscovy) did not allow him to mount any offensive actions and the majority of the wars he participated in were defensive ones (like the Smolensk War with Muscovy in 1634). A new armistice with Sweden signed in Stumsdorf (Sztumska Wies) knocked the last argument out of the king's hand. After that the king wanted to use his ships to organize the first Polish merchant company (with help of Hewel), however Hewel's death stopped even those plans. Finally the ships were sold. The built fortifications were salt in Denmark's and the Danzig Patriciate eyes and under their pressure were destroyed in 1640s.

The Swedes were without king after the death of Gustavus Adolphus of Sweden and lost battles in Germany. The Polish nobles did not want to fight a new war so when the Swedes returned most of the lands they captured in the previous war, a new armistice for 35 years was signed. The cost of the Polish preparations for this war was comparable with the costs of the king's relief of Smolensk in 1634 and his campaign against Muscovy.

=== Commonwealth fleet after 1630s ===
The fleet was destroyed in 1637 by Denmark, without a declaration of war.

The remaining ships were sold in the years 1641–1643, which marked the end of the Commonwealth Navy.

== Ships of the Polish–Lithuanian Commonwealth Navy ==
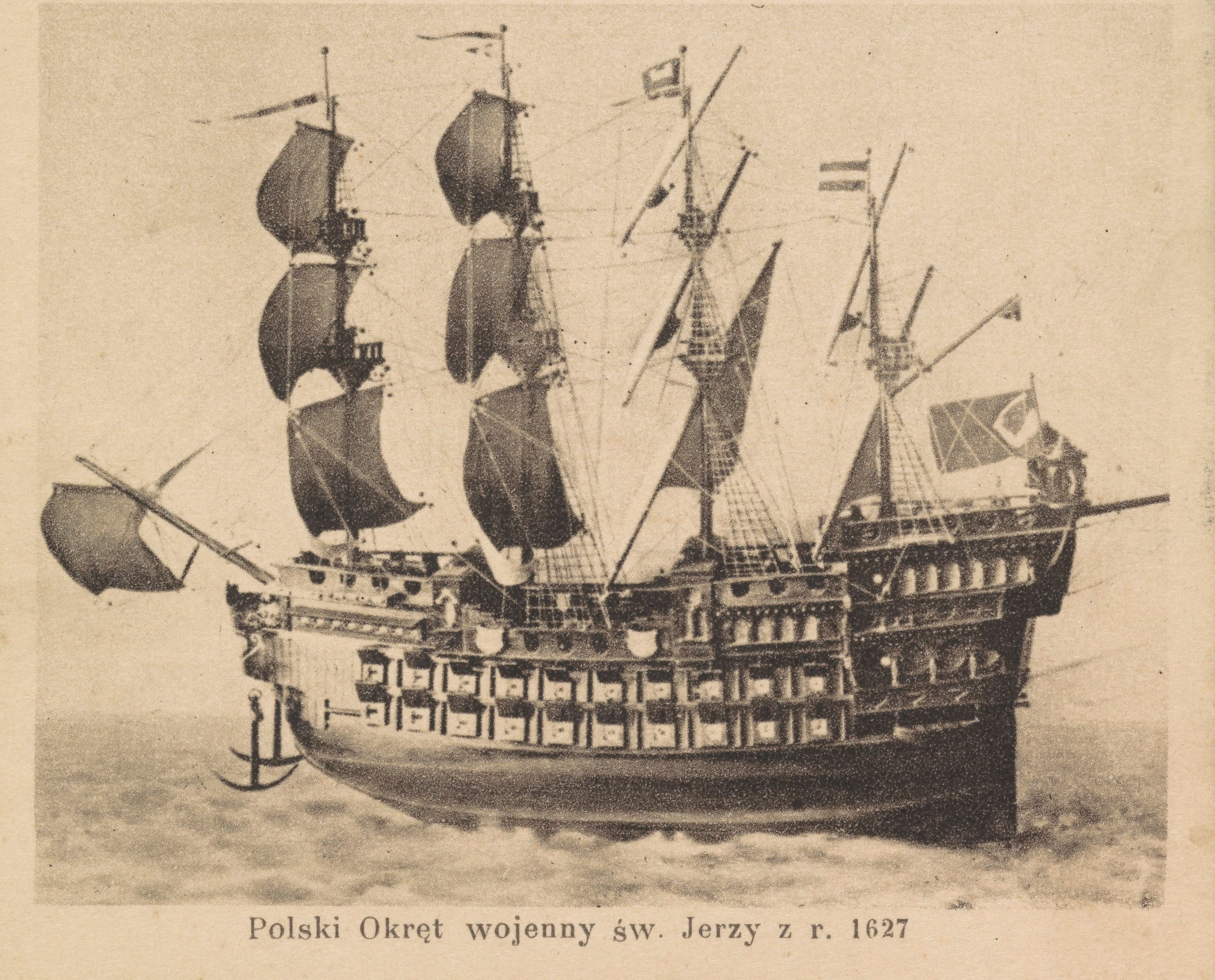
Depiction of the galleon Rycerz Święty Jerzy

- Rycerz Święty Jerzy ("Knight St George") – galleon, 31 guns, 400t under the command of Johann Storch
- Latający Jeleń ("Flying Deer") – galleon, 20 guns, 300t under the command of Ellert Appelman
- Panna Wodna ("Sea Virgo") – 12 guns, 160t under the command of Adolf von Arzen
- Czarny Kruk ("Black Raven") – 16 guns, 260t under the command of Alexander Bley
- Żółty Lew ("Yellow Lion") – 10 guns, 120t under the command of Hans Kizer
- Wodnik ("Aquarius") – galleon, 17 guns, 200t under the command of Hermann Witte
- Król Dawid ("King David") – galleon, 31 guns, 400t, under James Murray (also known as Jakub Mora)
- Arka Noego ("Noah's Ark") – 16 guns, 180t under the command of Magnus Wesman
- Biały Lew ("White Lion") – 8 guns, 200t under the command of Peter Böse
- Płomień ("Fireblaze") – 18 guns, 240t

== See also ==
- Polish Navy
- Lithuanian Navy
