= Dutch diaspora =

Ethnic diaspora

Distribution of Dutch diaspora Netherlands ≥1,000,000 ≥100,000 ≥10,000 ≥1,000

The Dutch diaspora consists of the Dutch and their descendants living outside the Netherlands.

Emigration from the Netherlands has been occurring for since at least the 17th century, and may be traced back to the international presence of the Dutch Empire and its monopoly on mercantile shipping in many parts of the world.

Dutch people settled permanently in a number of former Dutch colonies or trading enclaves abroad, namely the Dutch Caribbean, the Dutch Cape Colony, the Dutch East Indies, Surinam, and New Netherland. Since the end of the Second World War, the largest proportion of Dutch emigrants have moved to Anglophone countries, namely Canada, Australia, New Zealand, and the United States, mainly seeking better employment opportunities and incentives from the Dutch government due to fear of overpopulation. In total, one third of Dutch citizens emigrated to other countries between 1948 and 1992. Postwar emigration from the Netherlands peaked between 1948 and 1963, with occasional spikes in the 1980s and the mid-2000s. Cross-border migration to Belgium and Germany has become more common since 2001, driven by the rising cost of housing in major Dutch cities.

== History ==
The first big wave of Dutch immigrants to leave the Low Countries were from present day Northern Belgium as they wanted to escape the heavily urbanised cities in West Flanders. They arrived in Brandenburg in 1157. Due to this, the area is known as "Fläming" (Fleming) in reference to the Duchy that these immigrants came from. Because of a number of devastating floods in the provinces of Zeeland and Holland in the 12th century, large numbers of farmers migrated to The Wash in England, the delta of the Gironde in France, around Bremen, Hamburg and western North Rhine-Westphalia. Until the late 16th century, many Dutchmen and women (invited by the German margrave) moved to the delta of the Elbe, around Berlin, where they dried swamps, canalized rivers and built numerous dikes. Today, the Berlin dialect still bears some Dutch features.

The town of Nymburk in the Kingdom of Bohemia was settled by Dutch colonists during the medieval eastward migration in the 13th century.

Overseas emigration of the Dutch started around the 16th century, beginning a Dutch colonial empire. The first Dutch settlers arrived in the New World in 1614 and built a number of settlements around the mouth of the Hudson River, establishing the colony of New Netherland, with its capital at New Amsterdam (the future world metropolis of New York City). Dutch explorers also discovered Australia and New Zealand in 1606, though they did not settle the new lands; and Dutch immigration to these countries did not begin until after the Second World War. The Dutch were also one of the few Europeans to successfully settle Africa prior to the late 19th century.

== List of countries by population of Dutch heritage ==
Region of the world	Population	% of country	Citation
Dutch in North America	4,195,000		
(Canada) Dutch Canadians	1,112,000	3.23%	
(United States) Dutch Americans	Partial and full: 3,083,000; Full: 885,000	0.93%	
Dutch in the Caribbean	19,316		
(Curaçao) Dutch Curaçaoans	14,000	9%	
(Aruba) Dutch Arubans	4,300 (full)	4.3%	
(Sint Maarten) Dutch Sint Maarteners	1,016	2.2%	
Dutch in South America	1,600,000		
(Argentina) Dutch Argentines	400,000	1%	
(Chile) Dutch Chileans	150,000	1%	
Dutch in Europe	1,627,000		
(United Kingdom) Dutch British	40,000	0.06%	
Dutch people in Finland	2,000	0.04%	
Dutch people in France	Dutch ancestry: 1,000,000; Born in the Netherlands: 60,000	1.5%	
Dutch people in Germany	350,000	0.4%	
Dutch people in Belgium	121,000	1%	
Dutch people in Spain	50,000	<1%	
(Norway) (Sweden) (Denmark) Dutch people in Scandinavia	53,000		
Dutch people in Portugal	12,066	0.12%	
Dutch in Asia	95,000		
(Indonesia) Dutch Indonesians	55,000	0.06%	
(Sri Lanka) Dutch Burghers	40,000	0.3%	
Dutch in Oceania	482,000		
(Australia) Dutch Australians	382,000	1.5%	
(New Zealand) Dutch New Zealanders	100,000	2%	
Dutch in Africa	7,300,000		
(Namibia) Baster	50,000	2.5%	
(Namibia) (South Africa) Coloured	4,540,000		
(South Africa) Afrikaners	2,710,000	5.4%	
Total in Diaspora	~14,717,000		
Dutch people	18,156,000	%	
Total Worldwide	~33,000,000		

== Modern emigration statistics ==
Main destination countries of Dutch-born emigrants in 2020
	Ethnically Dutch	Second generation immigrant Dutch
Belgium	3,403	2,071
Germany	3,244	1,225
Spain	2,187	571
United Kingdom	1,531	1,093
United States	1,657	541
France	1,203	359
Australia	1,256	226
Curaçao	805	308
Turkey	-	1,031
Poland	-	937
Sweden	683	-
Portugal	631	-

== Distribution ==
=== Africa ===
==== South Africa ====
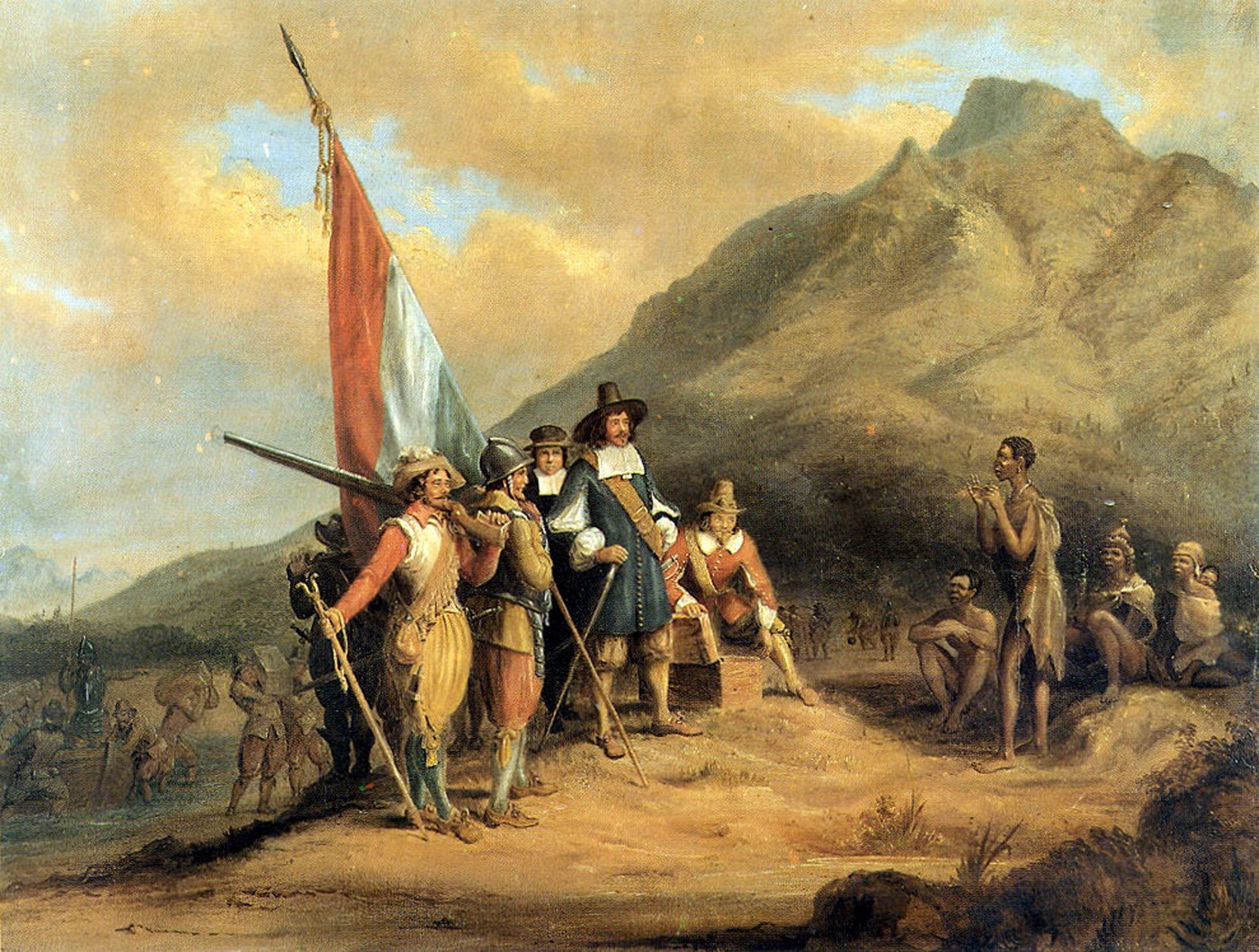
Painting depicting the arrival of Dutch settlers under Jan van Riebeeck at the Cape of Good Hope, 1652.

The Cape of Good Hope was first settled by Europeans under the auspices of the Dutch East India Company (also known by its Dutch initials VOC), which established a victualing station there in 1652 to provide its outward bound fleets with fresh provisions and a harbour of refuge during the long sea journey from Europe to Asia. Since the primary purpose of the Cape settlement at the time was to stock provisions for passing Dutch ships, the VOC offered grants of farmland to its employees under the condition they would cultivate grain for company warehouses, and released them from their contracts to save on their wages. Prospective employees had to be married Dutch citizens, considered "of good character" by the company, and had to commit to spending at least twenty years on the African continent. They were issued with a letter of freedom, known as a "vrijbrief", which released them from company service, and received farms of thirteen and a half morgen each. However, the new farmers were also subject to heavy restrictions: they were ordered to focus on cultivating grain, and each year their harvest was to be sold exclusively to Dutch officials at fixed prices. They were forbidden from growing tobacco, producing vegetables for any purpose other than personal consumption, or purchasing cattle from the native tribes at rates which differed from those set by the company. With time, these restrictions and other attempts by the colonial authorities to control the European population resulted in successive generations of settlers and their descendants becoming increasingly localised in their loyalties and national identity and hostile towards the colonial government.

Relatively few Dutch women accompanied the first Dutch settlers to the Cape of Good Hope, and one natural consequence of the unbalanced gender ratio was that between 1652 and 1672 some 75% of children born to slaves in the colony had Dutch fathers. The majority of slaves had been imported from the East Indies (Indonesia), India, Madagascar, and parts of eastern Africa. This resulted in the formation of a new ethnic group, the Cape Coloureds, most of whom adopted the Dutch language and were instrumental in shaping it into a new regional dialect, Afrikaans.

In 1691, there were at least 660 Dutch people living at the Cape of Good Hope. This had increased to about 13,000 by the end of Dutch rule, or one half of the Cape's European population. The remaining Europeans settled during the Dutch colonial era were Germans or French Huguenots, reflecting the multi-national nature of the VOC workforce and its settlements. Thereafter the number of people of Dutch ancestry at the Cape became difficult to estimate, due in part to the almost universal adoption of the Dutch language and the Dutch Reformed Church by those of German or French origin, as well as a significant degree of intermarriage. Since the late nineteenth century, the term Afrikaner has been evoked to describe white South Africans descended from the Cape's original Dutch-speaking settlers, regardless of ethnic heritage.

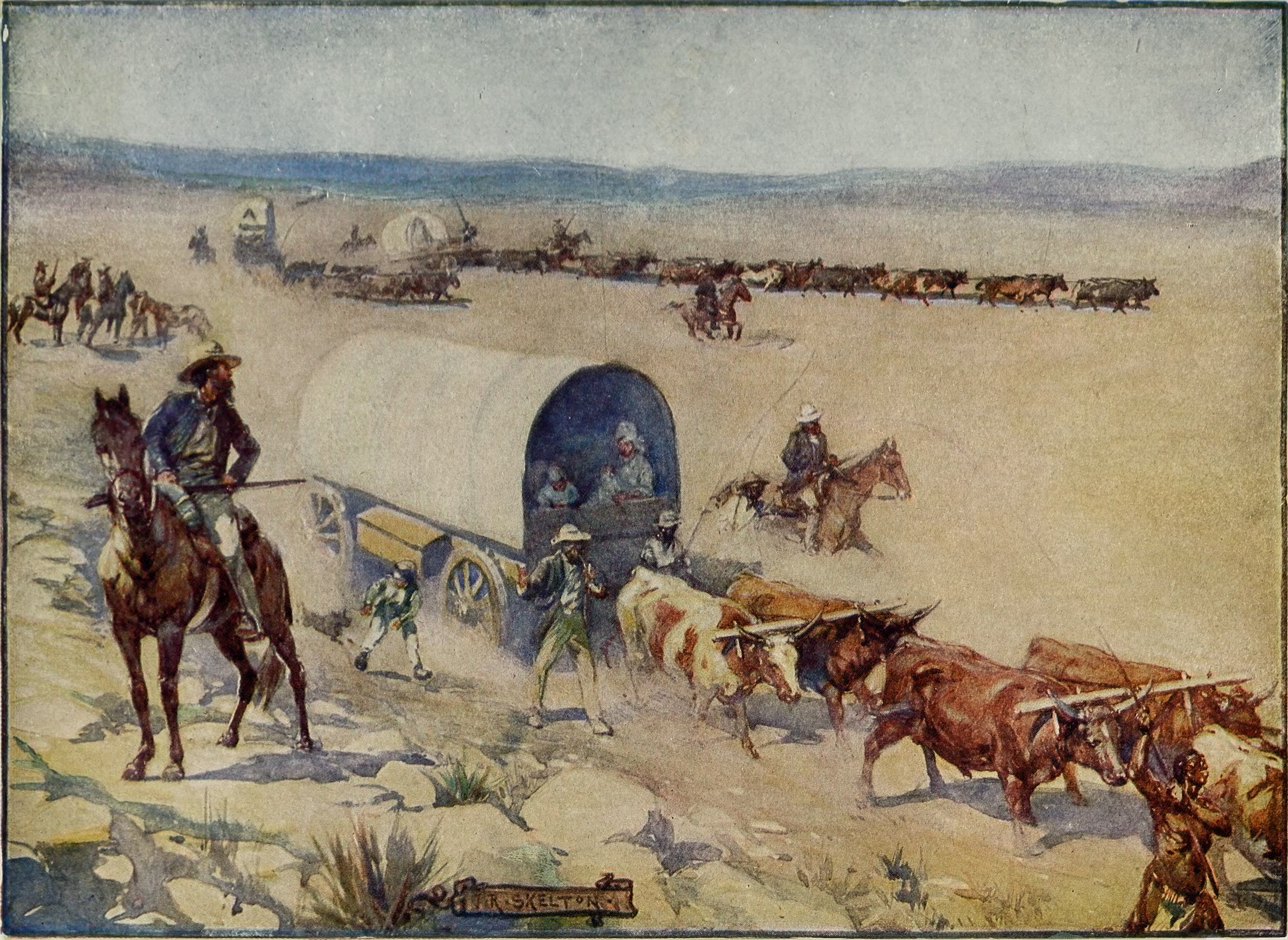
Boer Voortrekkers in South Africa

The colony was captured by the British during the Napoleonic Wars, as the Dutch Republic was transformed by France into the Batavian Republic which subsequently declared war on Britain. Following the end of the conflict, the Cape was formally ceded to Britain under the terms of the Treaty of Paris in 1815.

Many of the Afrikaner community soon grew disillusioned with British rule, in particular the imposition of an Anglophone common law system and the abolition of slavery in the Cape, which was a major source of income for many Afrikaners. One such Afrikaner was Christoffel Brand, son of a former senior VOC official, who became the first Speaker of the Parliament of the Cape of Good Hope. Brand claimed that "England has taken from the old colonists of the Cape everything that was dear to them: their country, their laws, their customs, their slaves, their money, yes even their mother tongue...[the Afrikaners] had done everything to prove that they wanted to be British, while their conquerors had continually worked to remind them they were Hollanders." In 1830, De Zuid-Afrikaan was founded as a Dutch-language newspaper by Brand to provide a mouthpiece for the Cape Dutch upper-class. It was followed shortly afterwards by the establishment of a university where Dutch was the official language and several Afrikaner societies for the arts. This was seen as the beginning of an Afrikaner ethnic consciousness: in 1835 one local Dutch-language newspaper noted the rise of a newfound sentiment that "a colonist of Dutch descent cannot become an Englishman, nor should he strive to be a Hollander".

The most rural section of the Afrikaner community, known as Boers, undertook the Great Trek deep into South Africa's interior and founding their own autonomous Boer republics, the Transvaal Republic and the Orange Free State. The Boer republics encouraged immigration from the Netherlands, as Dutch migrants were valued for their education and technical skills.

Another wave of Dutch immigration to South Africa occurred in the wake of World War II, when many Dutch citizens were moving abroad to escape housing shortages and depressed economic opportunities at home. South Africa registered a net gain of 45,000 Dutch immigrants between 1950 and 2001.

=== Asia ===
==== Indonesia ====
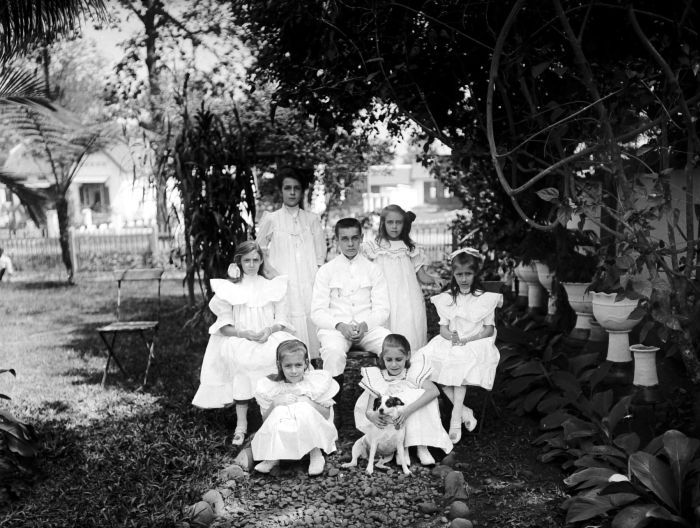
Dutch family in Java, early 20th century

In the Dutch East Indies (now Indonesia), the Dutch heavily interacted with the indigenous population, and as European women were almost non-existent, many Dutchmen married native women. This created a new group of people, the Dutch-Eurasians (Dutch: Indische Nederlanders) also known as 'Indos' or 'Indo-Europeans'. By 1930, there were more than 240,000 Europeans and 'Indo-Europeans' in the colony. After the Indonesian National Revolution many chose or were forced to leave the country and today about half a million Eurasians live in the Netherlands.

Although there are some who decided to take side with Indonesian, such as Poncke Princen, or joining Indonesian army after full sovereignty handover in 1950 such as Rokus Bernardus Visser.

With the booming of Indonesian economy in the 1970s and 1980s, some Dutch people decided to move to Indonesia, either as an expatriate who work on a temporary basis, or even staying permanently. One of them is Erik Meijer who have distinguished career with Indosat and Garuda Indonesia.

==== Kazakhstan ====
According to the 1989 census, 126 Dutch people lived in Kazakhstan.

==== Turkey ====
About 20,000 Dutch live in Turkey, mostly pensioners. The Dutch populated areas are mainly in the Marmara, Aegean, and Mediterranean regions of Turkey.

==== Turkmenistan ====
According to the 1995 census, 10 Dutch people lived in Turkmenistan.

=== Caribbean ===
Most Dutch settlement in the Caribbean occurred on the Dutch Caribbean islands of Aruba, Bonaire, Curaçao, Sint Maarten, Saba and Sint Eustatius.

Both the Leeward (Alonso de Ojeda, 1499) and Windward (Christopher Columbus, 1493) island groups were discovered and initially settled by the Spanish. In the 17th century, the islands were conquered by the Dutch West India Company after the defeat of Spain to the Netherlands in Eighty Years' War, with the largest island Curaçao being used as a regional trading hub for enslaved Africans and various goods.

Dutch settlement was relatively limited in the Caribbean during the colonial era, however there are sizable minorities of Dutch people on the Dutch Caribbean islands in modern times. There are also significant populations of partial Dutch or mixed-race descent on the islands, on Aruba Mestizos make up the majority of the population with many having significant Dutch heritage.

=== Europe ===
==== Estonia ====
According to the 2021 Estonian census, there were 345 Dutch people living in Estonia, including 186 in the capital city of Tallinn.

==== Latvia ====
179 Dutch people inhabited Latvia according to data from 2017.

==== Lithuania ====
According to the 2011 census, 52 Dutch people lived in Lithuania.

==== Poland ====
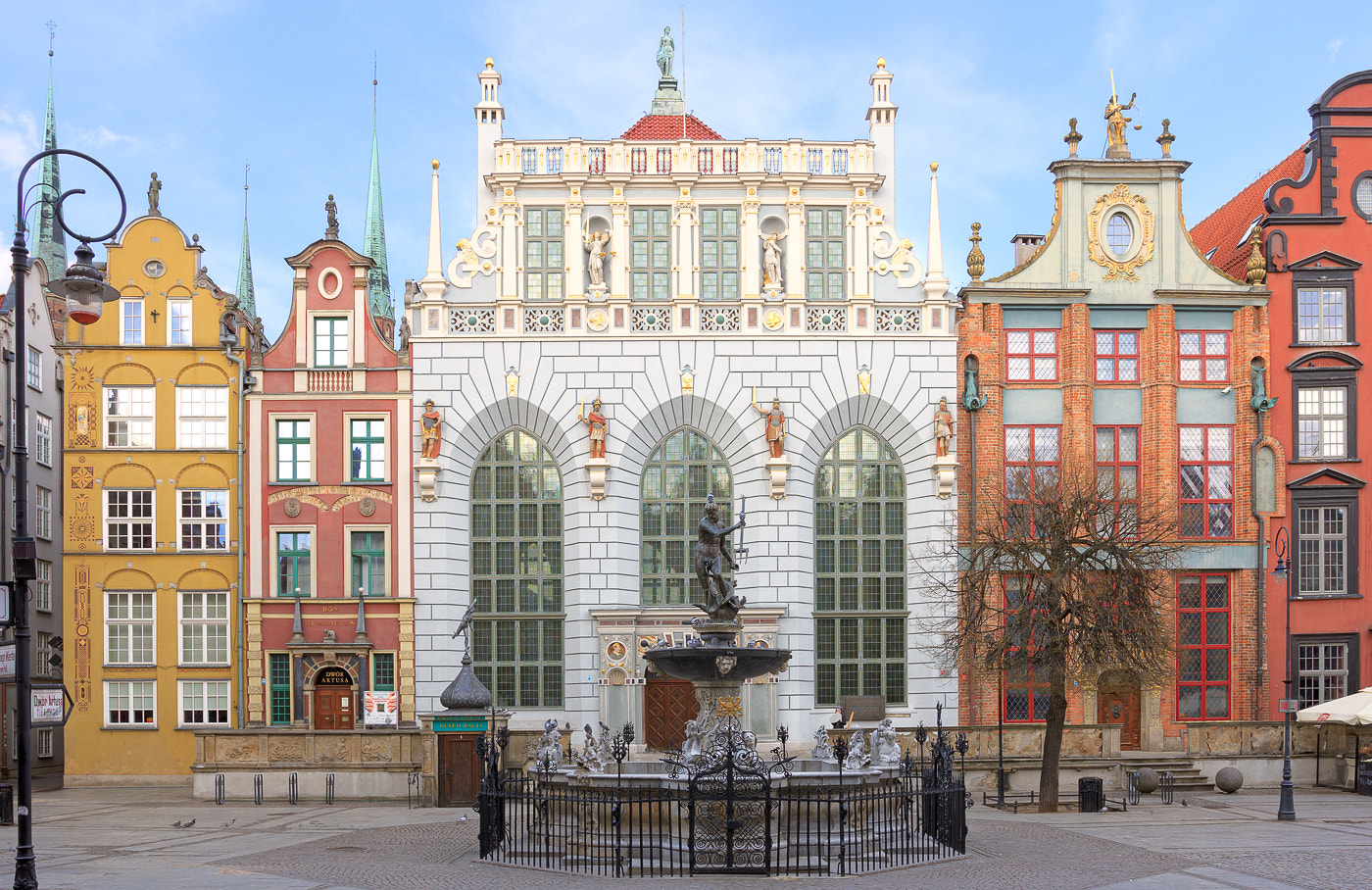
Artus Court, former seat of an association of Dutch merchants residing in Gdańsk, Poland

The Dutch diaspora in Poland dates back to the Middle Ages. The first place in present-day Poland where Dutch immigrants settled was Pasłęk in 1297, once renamed Holąd after the settlers. There is a claim that they were participants in the killing of Floris V, Count of Holland in 1296, who then fled east, which is alluded to by Dutch poet Joost van den Vondel in his work Gijsbrechcie van Aemstel (1637). Dutchman Frederick from Pasłęk soon became the lokator and mayor of the nearby town of Melzak (Pieniężno), and Dutch people from Pasłęk were probably its first settlers.

In 1489, Dutch Catholic monks settled in Chełmno, however, due to the Reformation in the Netherlands, there was no influx of further Dutch monks. Since the 16th century, Poland was home to a sizeable Dutch diaspora, made up mainly of Mennonites, religious refugees from the Netherlands, who settled mostly in the Vistula delta, Masovia and Michalin, and, following the Partitions of Poland, also near the cities of Lwów and Gródek Jagielloński in the Austrian Partition of Poland. They enjoyed religious freedoms in Poland, confirmed by the Warsaw Confederation of 1573.

In the 2011 Polish census, 3,927 people declared Dutch nationality, of which 3,326 declared both Polish and Dutch nationality.

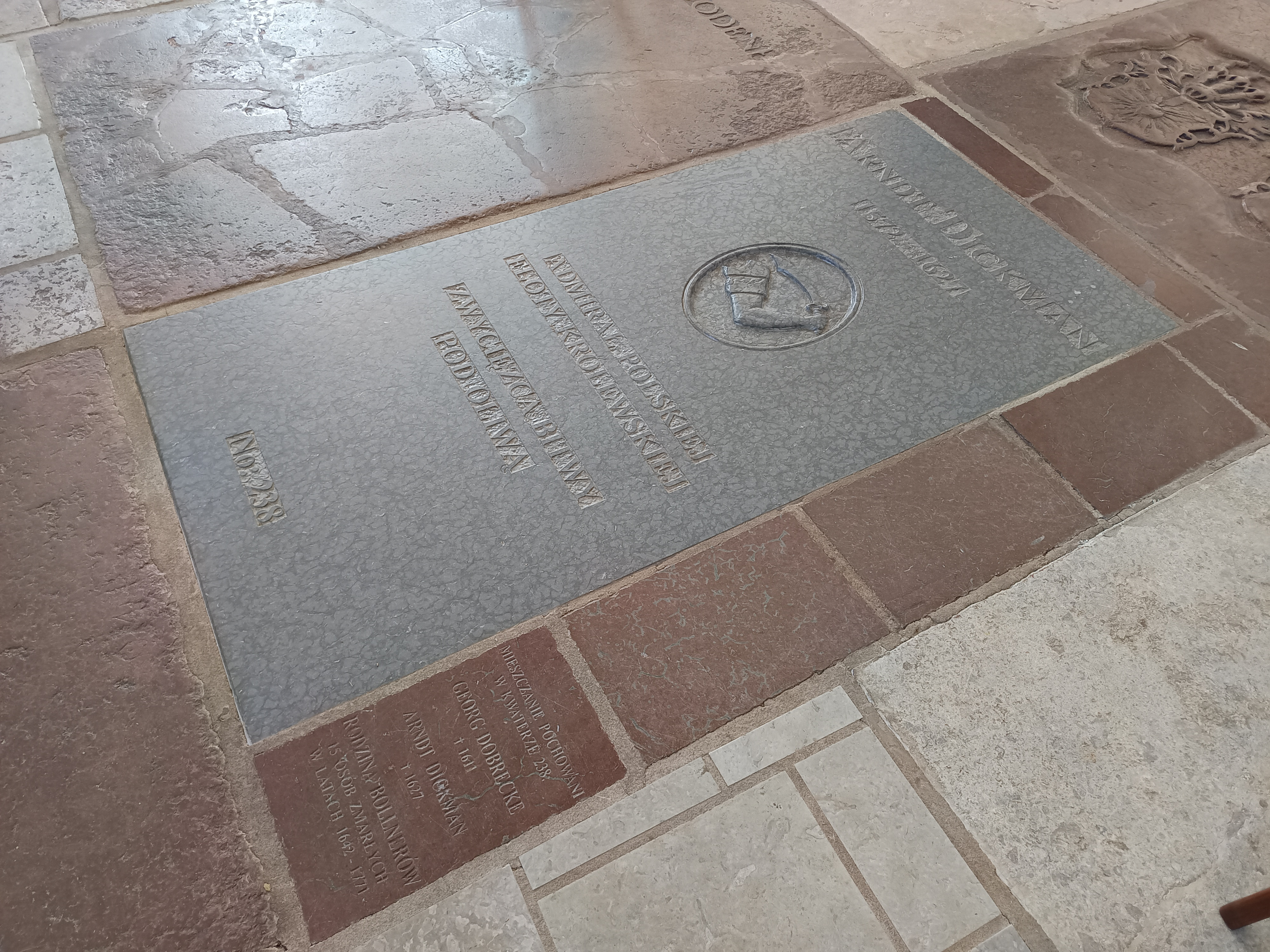
Ledger stone of Arend Dickmann, Admiral of the Polish–Lithuanian Commonwealth Navy in the St. Mary's Church, Gdańsk

Notable people include:

- Hans Vredeman de Vries (c. 1527–c. 1607), architect, painter and engineer
- Arend Dickmann (1572–1627), Admiral of the Polish–Lithuanian Commonwealth Navy
- Adam Wybe (1584–1653), inventor, constructor of the world's first aerial lift in Gdańsk, Poland
- Hendrick van Uylenburgh (c. 1587–1661), art dealer
- Pieter Soutman (c. 1593–1657), painter and printmaker
- Willem Hondius (c. 1598–1652/1658), engraver, cartographer and painter
- Peter Danckerts de Rij (1605–1660), painter
- Tylman van Gameren (1632–1706), Baroque architect and engineer
- Jan de Witte (1709–1785), military engineer, officer and architect

==== Spain ====
According to the Spanish National Institute of Statistics, on 1 January 2022, 50,274 Dutch were living in that country.

==== United Kingdom ====
The 2001 UK Census recorded 40,438 Dutch-born people living in the UK. The 2011 Census recorded 57,439 Dutch-born residents in England, 1,642 in Wales, 4,117 in Scotland and 515 in Northern Ireland. The Office for National Statistics estimates that the figure for the whole of the UK was 68,000 in 2019.

=== North America ===
==== Canada ====
Dutch emigration to Canada peaked between 1951 and 1953, when an average of 20,000 people per year made the crossing. This exodus followed the harsh years in Europe as a result of the Second World War. One of the reasons many Dutch chose Canada as their new home was because of the excellent relations between the two countries, which specially blossomed because it was mainly Canadian troops who liberated the Netherlands in 1944-1945.

Today almost 400,000 people of Dutch ancestry are registered as permanently living in Canada. About 130,000 Canadians were born in the Netherlands and there are another 600,000 Canadian citizens with at least one Dutch parent.

According to Statistics Canada in 2016, some 1,111,645 Canadians identified their ethnic origin to be Dutch.

==== United States ====
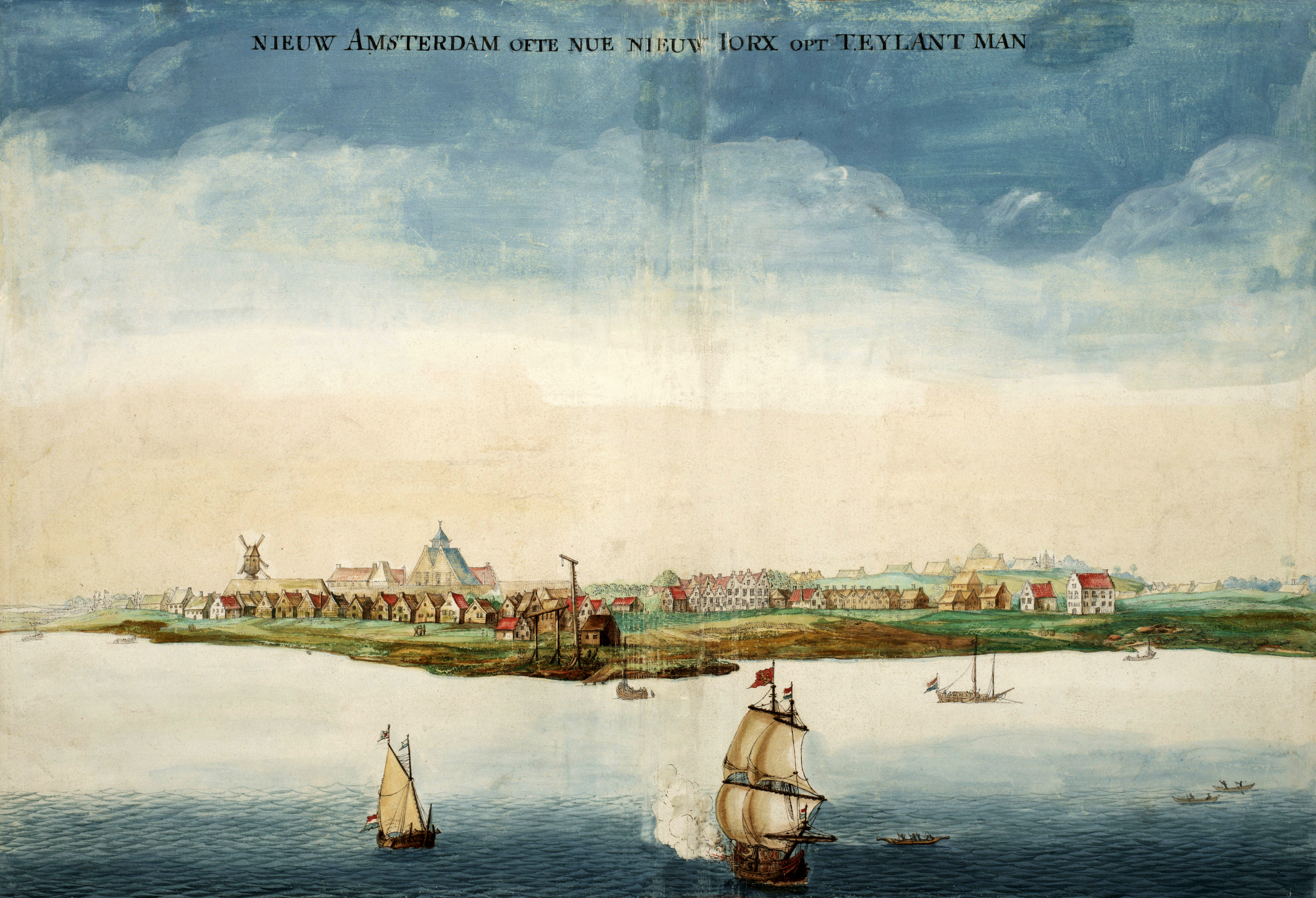
New Amsterdam in 1664

The first Dutchmen to come to the United States of America were explorers led by English captain Henry Hudson (in the service of the Dutch Republic) who arrived in 1609 and mapped what is now known as the Hudson River on the ship De Halve Maen (or the Half Moon in English). Their initial goal was to find an alternative route to Asia, but they found good farmland and plenty of wildlife instead.

The Dutch were one of the earliest Europeans who made their way to the New World. In 1614, the first Dutch settlers arrived and founded a number of villages and a town called New Amsterdam on the East Coast, which would become the future world metropolis of New York City. Nowadays, towns with prominent Dutch communities are located in the Midwest, particularly in the Chicago metropolitan area, Wisconsin, West Michigan, Iowa and some other northern states. Sioux Center, Iowa is the city with the largest percentage of Dutch in the United States (66% of the total population). Also, there are three private high schools with their respective primary school feeders in the Chicago area that mainly serve the Dutch-American community. These communities can be found in DuPage County, southwest Cook County and Northwest Indiana.

=== South America ===
The majority of Dutch settlement in South America was limited to Suriname, however, only 86,000 Dutch descendants are found in the country. Sizable Dutch-descendant communities exist in urban areas and coastal port towns, mainly in Brazil, but also with significant numbers in Chile and Guyana.

==== Brazil ====
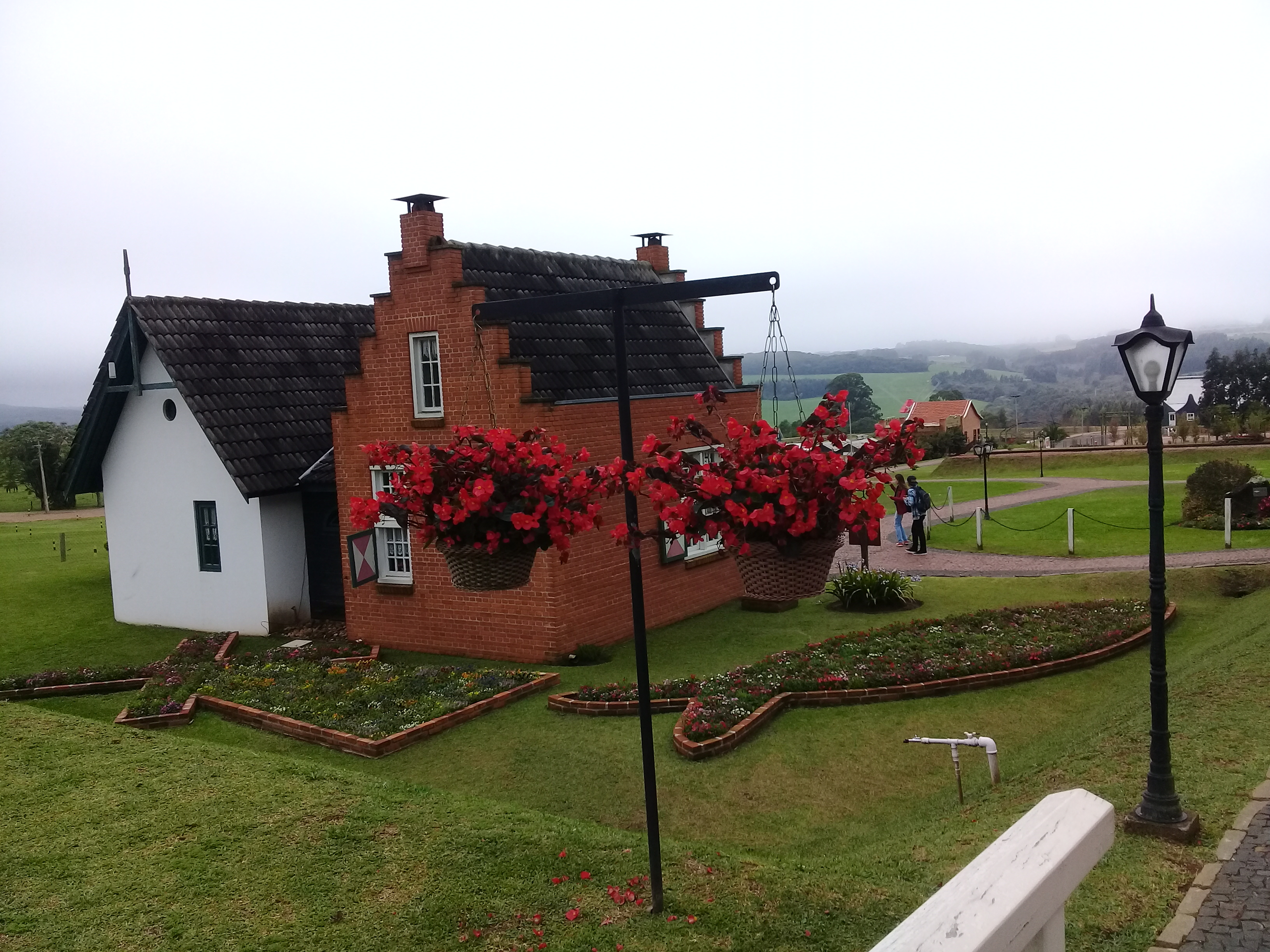
Dutch houses at Carambeí Historical Park

It is estimated that over 1,000,000 people in Brazil have full or partial Dutch ancestry.

The first and largest wave of Dutch settlers in Brazil was between 1640 and 1656. A Dutch colony was established in Northeast Brazil; over 30.000 people settled in the region. When the Portuguese Empire invaded the colony, most of the Dutch settlers went to areas further inland and changed their surnames to Portuguese ones. Today, descendants live in the states of Pernambuco, Ceará, Paraíba, and Rio Grande Norte. The number of descendants is unknown, but genetic studies showed a strong presence of Northern European haplogroups in Brazilians of this region. Only Southern Brazil showed to have more Nordic DNA because the region was populated by German immigrants. Other Dutch settlers left and migrated to Caribbean; others who left are Dutch Jewish settlers and Dutch-speaking Portuguese settlers.

After two centuries, many Dutch immigrants to Brazil went to the state of Espírito Santo between 1858 and 1862. All further immigration ceased and contacts with the homeland withered. The "lost settlement" was only rediscovered after several years, in 1873. Except for the Zeelanders in Holanda, Brazil attracted few Dutch until after 1900. From 1906 through 1913, over 3.500 Dutch emigrated there, mainly in 1908–1909.

==== Chile ====
It is estimated that as many as 10,000 Chileans are of Dutch descent, most of them located in Malleco, Gorbea, Pitrufquén, Faja Maisan, and around Temuco.

==== Suriname ====
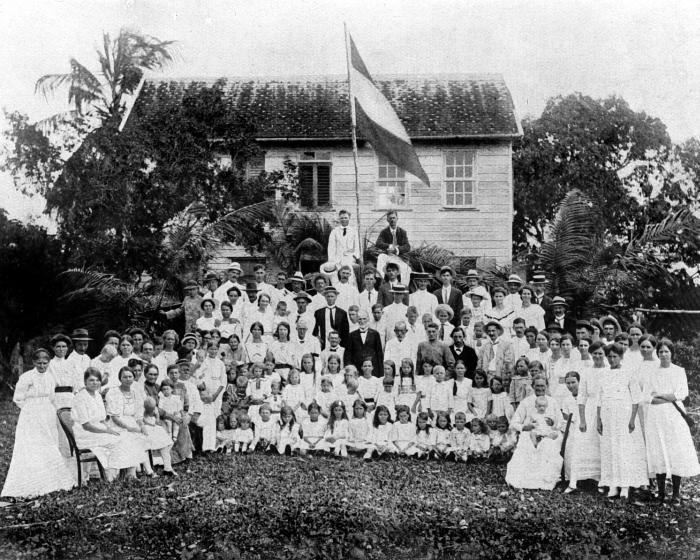
Dutch colonists in Suriname, 1920

Dutch migrant settlers in search of a better life started arriving in Suriname (previously known as Dutch Guiana) in the 19th century with the boeroes (not to be confused with the South African Boeren), farmers arriving from the Dutch provinces of Gelderland and Groningen. Many Dutch settlers left Suriname after independence in 1975. Furthermore, the Surinamese ethnic group Creoles, persons of mixed African-European ancestry, are partially of Dutch descent.

=== Oceania ===
==== Australia ====
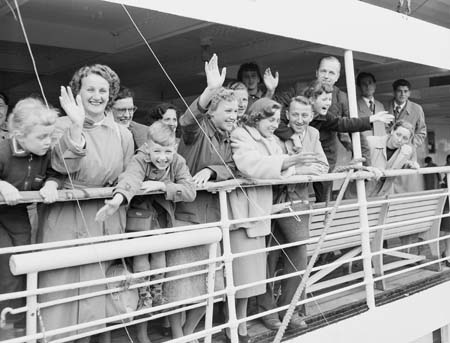
Dutch migrants arriving in Australia in 1954

Although the Dutch were the first Europeans to reach Australia, they have never made a great impact as a group of settlers. At the time of Australia's discovery the Dutch were on the winning hand in the Eighty Years' War and as a result there was little religious persecution. They did not find the kind of opportunities for trade they had learned to expect in the Dutch East Indies.

In the Dutch Golden Age regions with high unemployment were also rare. Indeed, the Dutch Republic was an immigration country itself throughout the 17th century. As a result, there never was the kind of mass emigration by the Dutch similar to that of the Irish, Germans, Italians or by comparison, Yugoslavians. Only after the Second World War was there significant migration from the Netherlands to Australia. This certainly does not mean that they have not made a contribution to Australia. As individuals many have made an impressive and lasting contribution to their adopted country.

==== New Zealand ====
Dutchman Abel Tasman was the first European to sight New Zealand in December 1642, though he was attacked by Māori before he could land in the area at the northwestern tip of the South Island now known as Golden Bay. As a result, the nation was subsequently named Nieuw-Zeeland by Dutch cartographers after the Dutch province of Zeeland.

The modern migration of the Dutch to New Zealand started in the 1950s. Those Dutch settlers came from present-day Indonesia when it won independence and majority of Dutch settlers left their homes in Indonesia. Many of them were hard-working and achieved success, among other activities, in agriculture (particularly growing of tulips) and in hospitality. According to the 2006 census results, over 20,000 inhabitants of New Zealand were Dutch born.

== See also ==
- European emigration
- List of diasporas
