= Netherlands–Poland relations =

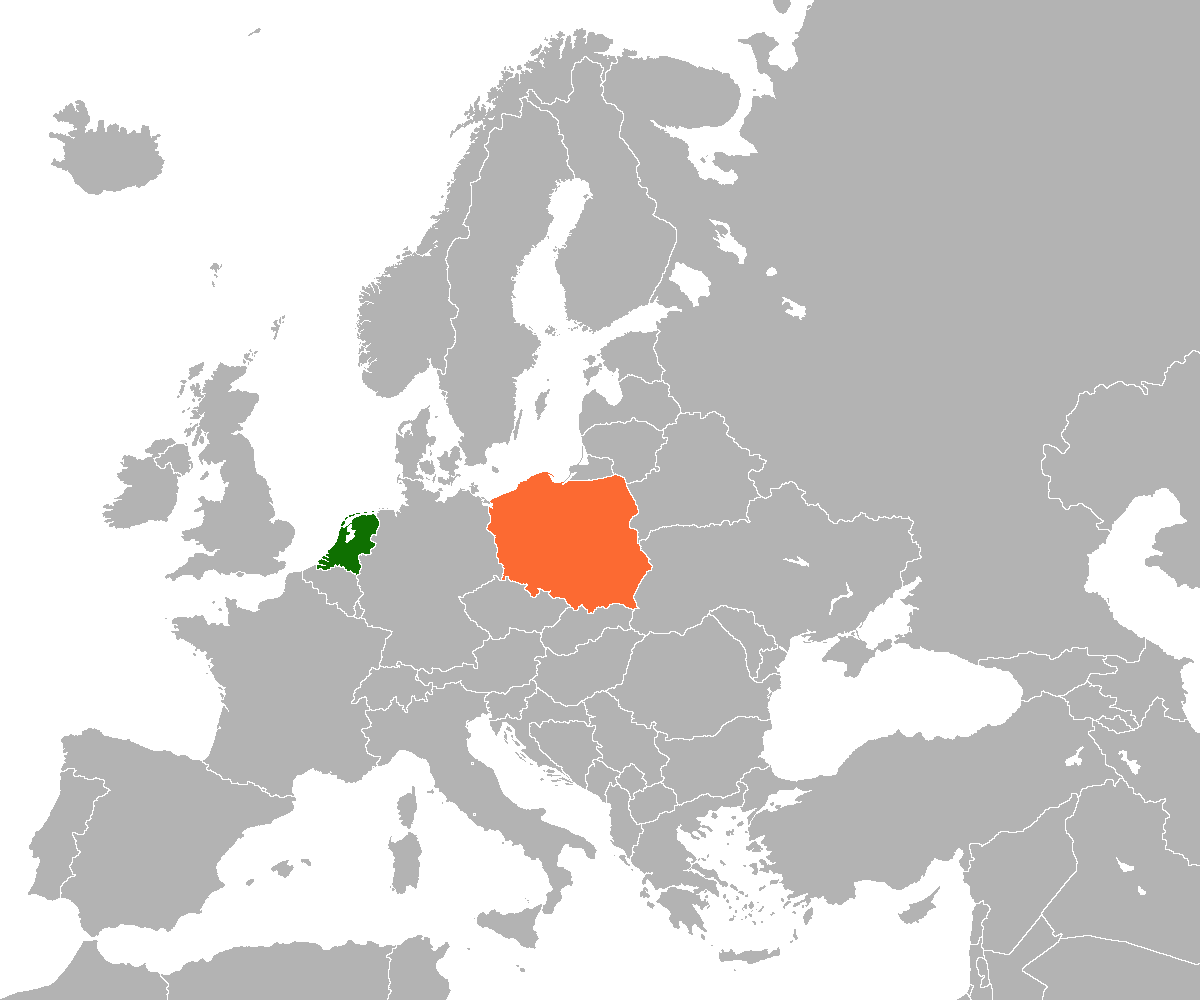
- Netherlands: Poland

Netherlands–Poland relations are the bilateral relations between the Netherlands and Poland. The two nations have had historically close relations for several hundred years, owing to frequent migrations in both directions, substantial cultural exchange and extensive trade, cemented by the Polish role in the liberation of the Netherlands from Nazi German occupation during World War II. the Netherlands has an embassy in Warsaw. Poland has an embassy in The Hague. Both nations are members of the Council of Europe, European Union, NATO and OECD.

== History ==
=== Early history ===
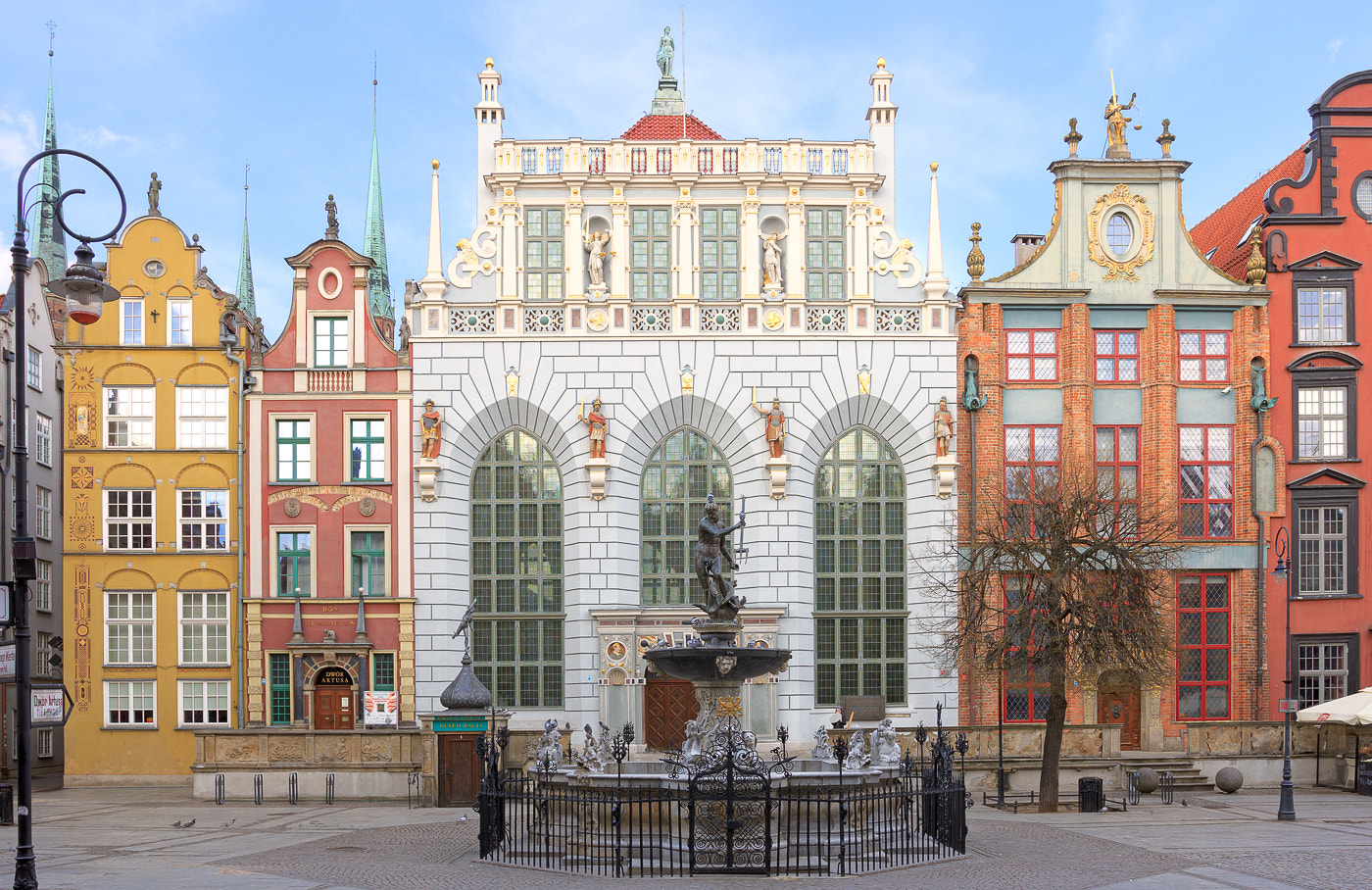
Artus Court, former seat of an association of Dutch merchants residing in Gdańsk, Poland

Two countries have a long-standing relationship dated back from the Middle Ages. Maritime trade between the Polish chief port city of Gdańsk and the Dutch main port cities of Amsterdam and Rotterdam had expanded since the 13th century. In 1489, Dutch Catholic monks settled in Chełmno, however, due to the Reformation in the Netherlands, there was no influx of further Dutch monks. At the beginning of the 16th century, Polish humanists Jan Łaski, Andrzej Frycz Modrzewski, Piotr Tomicki, Krzysztof Szydłowiecki and Jan Dantyszek established close contacts with Dutch humanist Erasmus.

The strong tie began in the 16th century when Dutch Mennonites began to settle in Poland to flee from persecutions across Europe. They settled mainly in the Vistula delta, and later also in Masovia and in Michalin in the Berdyczów county. Many of Mennonites' technique, cultures, contributions are still remaining in Poland today as an example of historical tolerance of the Polish–Lithuanian Commonwealth.

The Poles observed and learned the tactics of Dutch commander Maurice of Orange and Spanish commander Ambrogio Spinola during the Eighty Years' War, staying in their camps and taking part in the sieges of a number of cities. The so-called Old Dutch style of bastion fortifications became popular in Poland in the late 16th and early 17th centuries, applied in various cities including Gdańsk, Toruń, Zamość, Łańcut, Elbląg, Królewiec, Brody and Żółkiew, with Polish military engineer Adam Freytag, who took part in the war on the Dutch side, including the Siege of 's-Hertogenbosch, becoming the author of the first manual of such fortifications.

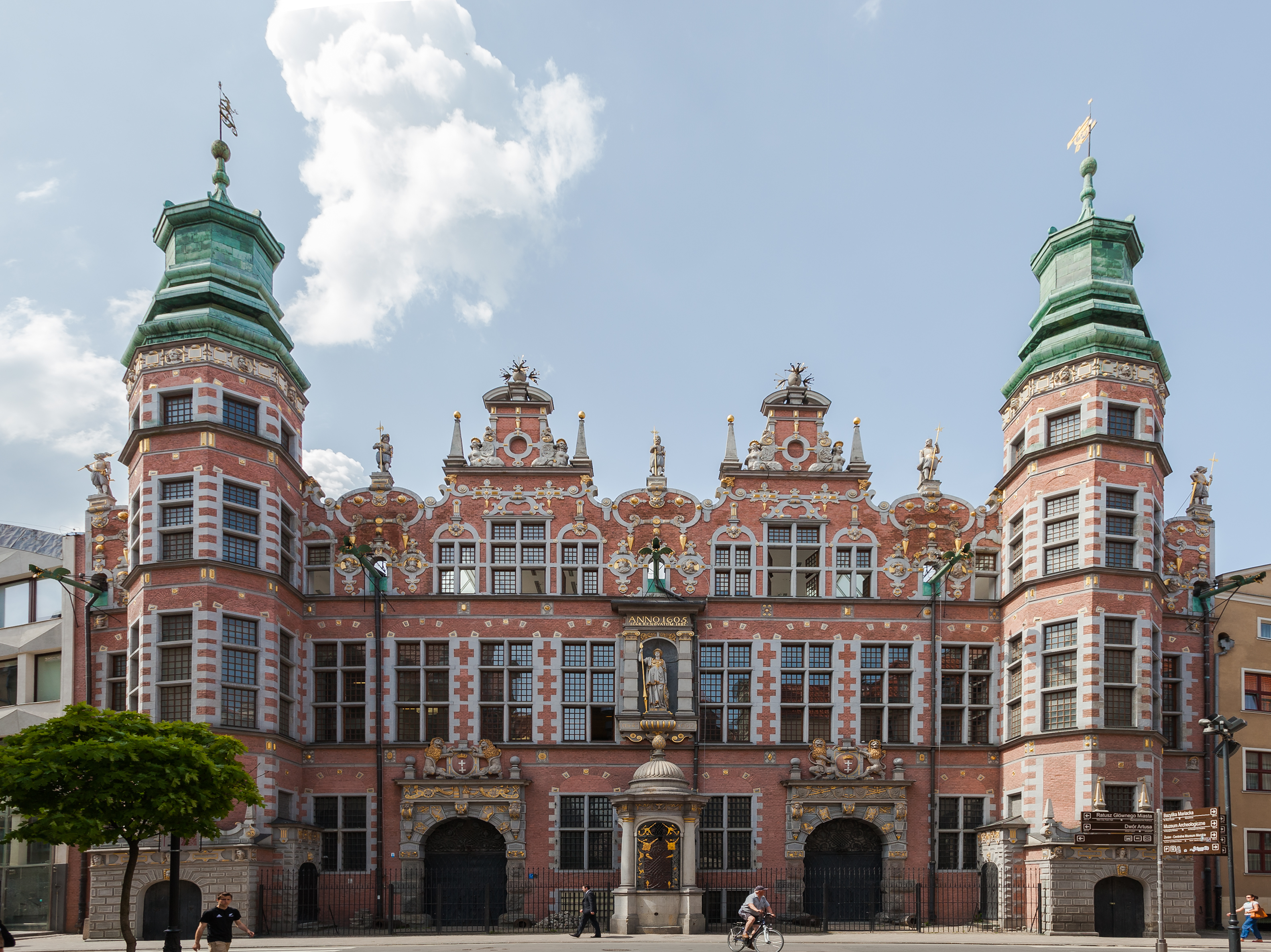
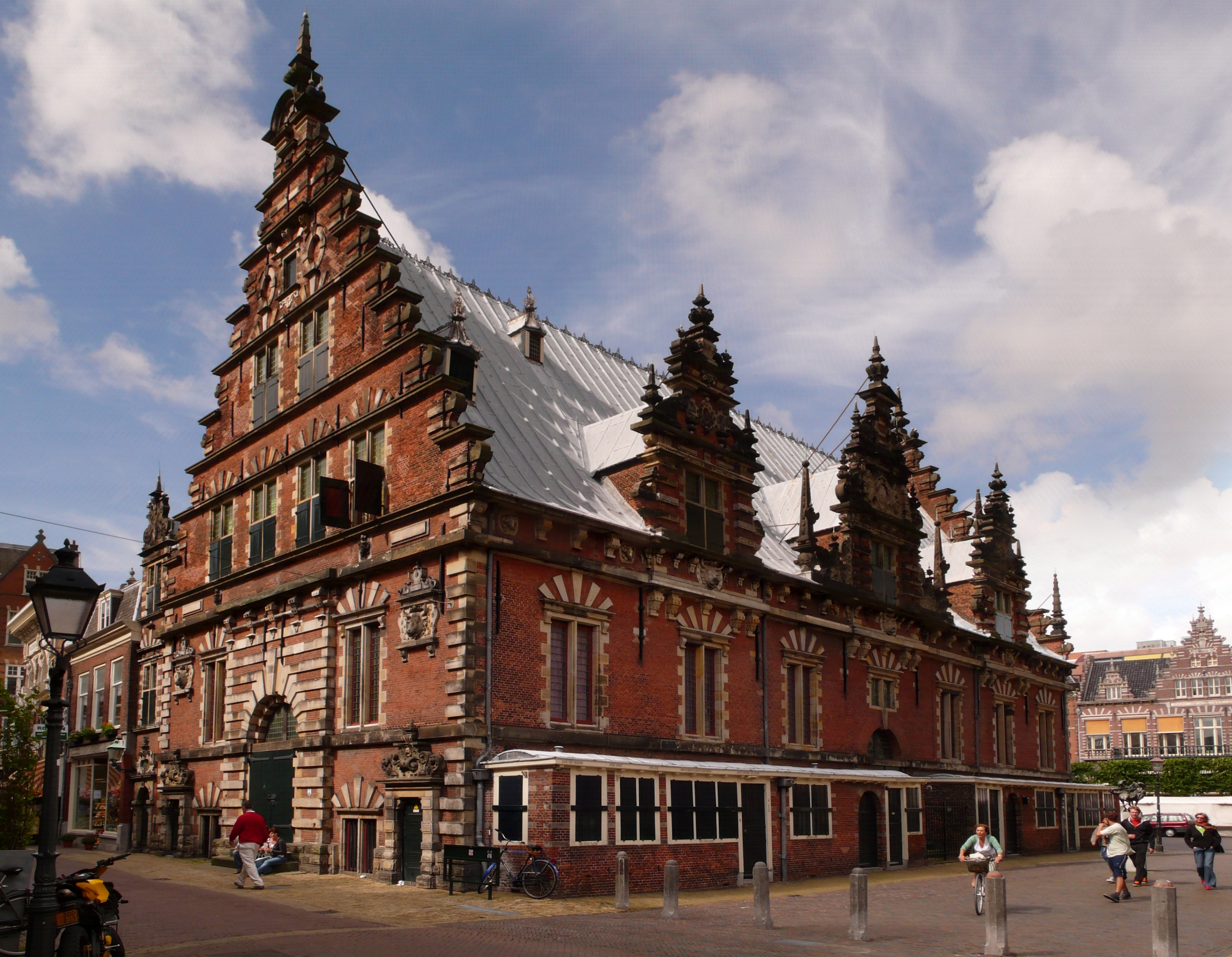
The Great Armoury in Gdańsk (left) was inspired by the Vleeshal in Haarlem (right).

There were also some migrations from Poland to the Netherlands, and migrations of non-Mennonites from the Netherlands to Poland. Notable Dutch immigrants in Poland included Arend Dickmann, Admiral of the Polish–Lithuanian Commonwealth Navy who led Poland to victory in the naval Battle of Oliwa of 1627 against the Swedish invaders (see also: Poland–Sweden relations), Adam Wybe, inventor who constructed the world's first aerial lift in Gdańsk, Poland in 1644, and famous 17th-century Baroque architect Tylman van Gameren ennobled in Poland as Tylman Gamerski. Dutch painters Hans Vredeman de Vries, Peeter Danckers de Rij and Pieter Soutman were active in Poland, the latter two being court painters of the Polish kings, and Polish painters Krzysztof Lubieniecki and Teodor Lubieniecki were active in the Netherlands. On the other hand, Poland's most renowned 17th-century astronomer, Jan Heweliusz, and 18th-century jurist, poet, and political activist, author of the lyrics of the Polish national anthem, Józef Wybicki, studied at the Leiden University before their return to Poland, Polish Admiral Krzysztof Arciszewski also studied at Leiden and then served in the Dutch West India Company and was one of the commanders of the Dutch invasions of Brazil, whereas renowned 18th-century Dutch physicist Daniel Gabriel Fahrenheit was an immigrant from Poland.

As a result of intense cultural exchange, some Mannerist structures in Poland were inspired by the Mannerist architecture of the Netherlands. Several Dutch painters, including Rembrandt, Ferdinand Bol and Caspar Netscher, drew inspiration from Polish culture, which they immortalized in their paintings, and a number of Polish painters drew inspiration from Dutch paintings. Dutch engravers Romeyn de Hooghe and Willem Hondius created portraits of Polish kings Władysław IV Vasa and John III Sobieski, respectively, which now are part of the collection of the Rijksmuseum in Amsterdam.

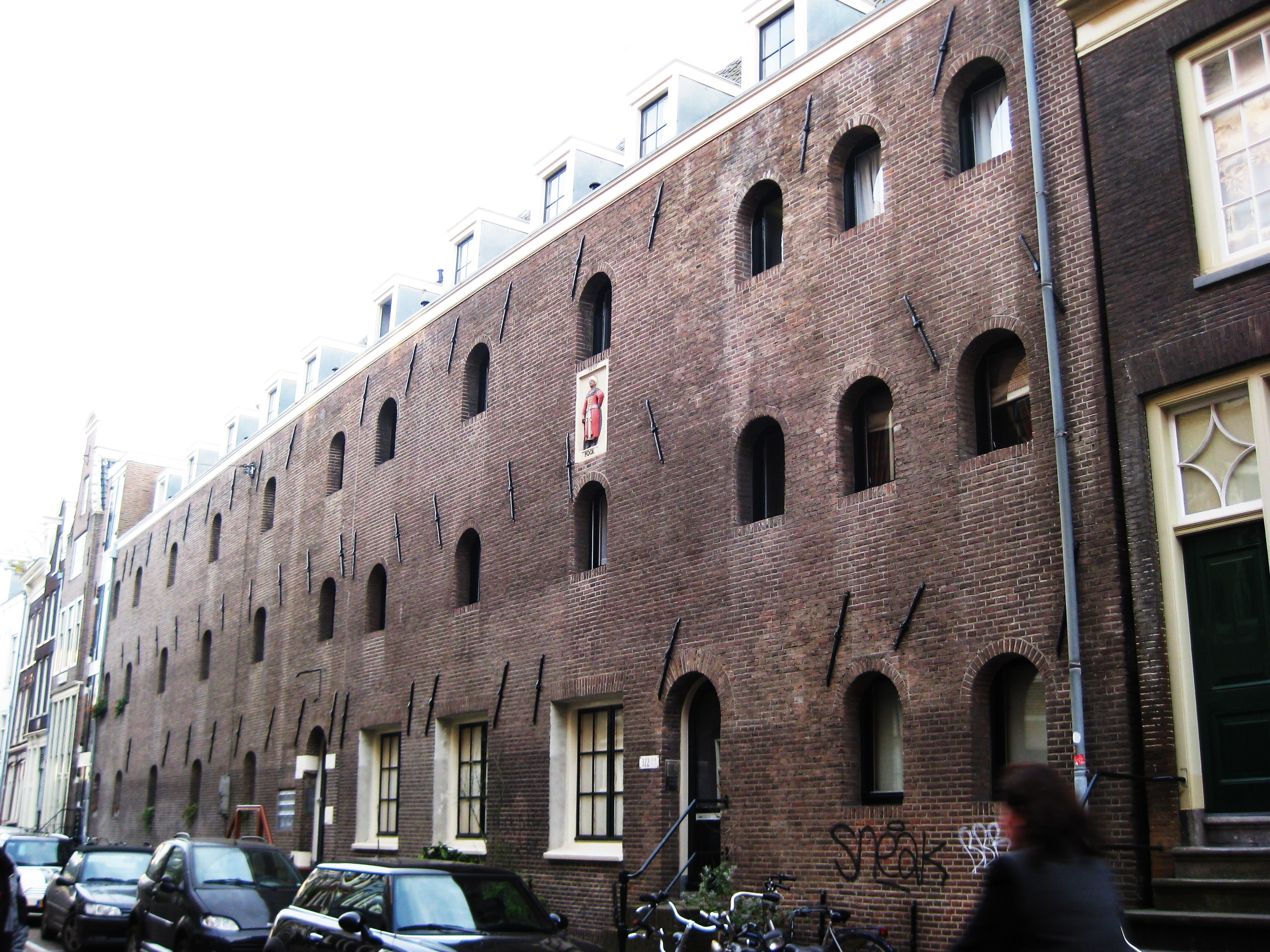
17th-century grain granary with a bas-relief of a Polish nobleman in Amsterdam, remnant of the historically extensive Dutch–Polish trade

From the 15th and 16th centuries, Dordrecht joined Amsterdam and Rotterdam as one of the Dutch centers for trade with Poland, and merchants from the inland major Polish cities like Kraków and Toruń also reached the Netherlands. During the Dutch Golden Age, goods were transported between the Netherlands and Poland freely, with Dutch traders gained dominant positions in trade with the Poles, to the expansion of arts and architecture. The Dutch Republic was Poland's largest partner in maritime trade, and as of 1585, Dutch ships made up 52% of the ships passing from the Polish chief port city of Gdańsk through the Øresund strait to western Europe. Also the port city of Królewiec acted as an intermediary in maritime trade between Poland and the Netherlands, with its 17th-century stock exchange including a painting depicting a townswoman buying goods from a Pole and a Dutchman, embracing the notion that the city's prosperity was based on trade with the East and West, particularly Poland and the Netherlands. The Dutch imported mainly grain, wax, flax, tar and beer, while the Poles imported mainly cloth, wine and precious goods, especially pearls. By the 17th century, there were several granaries in Amsterdam solely for storing grain from Poland, bearing Polish-inspired names. In early modern times, wooden piles imported by ship from Poland were often used to build foundations in Amsterdam. Delft pottery was popular throughout Poland. Some Polish bankers brokered loans and held assets in Dutch banks. During the 1766 Polish monetary reform, the new Polish ducats were modeled on Dutch ducats, common in circulation in Poland.

Relationship between two countries would have been severed by the Partitions of Poland, and for most of next 123 years, there had been no official tie between two. Nonetheless, Polish immigrants fleeing persecution in Russia, Austria and Prussia got supported in the Netherlands and sometimes settled there. In the late 18th century, some Dutch Mennonites settled near the cities of Lwów and Gródek Jagielloński in the Austrian Partition of Poland.

=== 20th century ===
After the World War I and the rebirth of Poland, two countries once again established relations. Trade contacts have been revived. The Dutch company Philips has launched an electric lamp factory and a scientific research laboratory in Poland. The ORP Sęp and ORP Orzeł submarines of the Polish Navy were built in the Netherlands, co-designed by Polish engineer Kazimierz Leski.

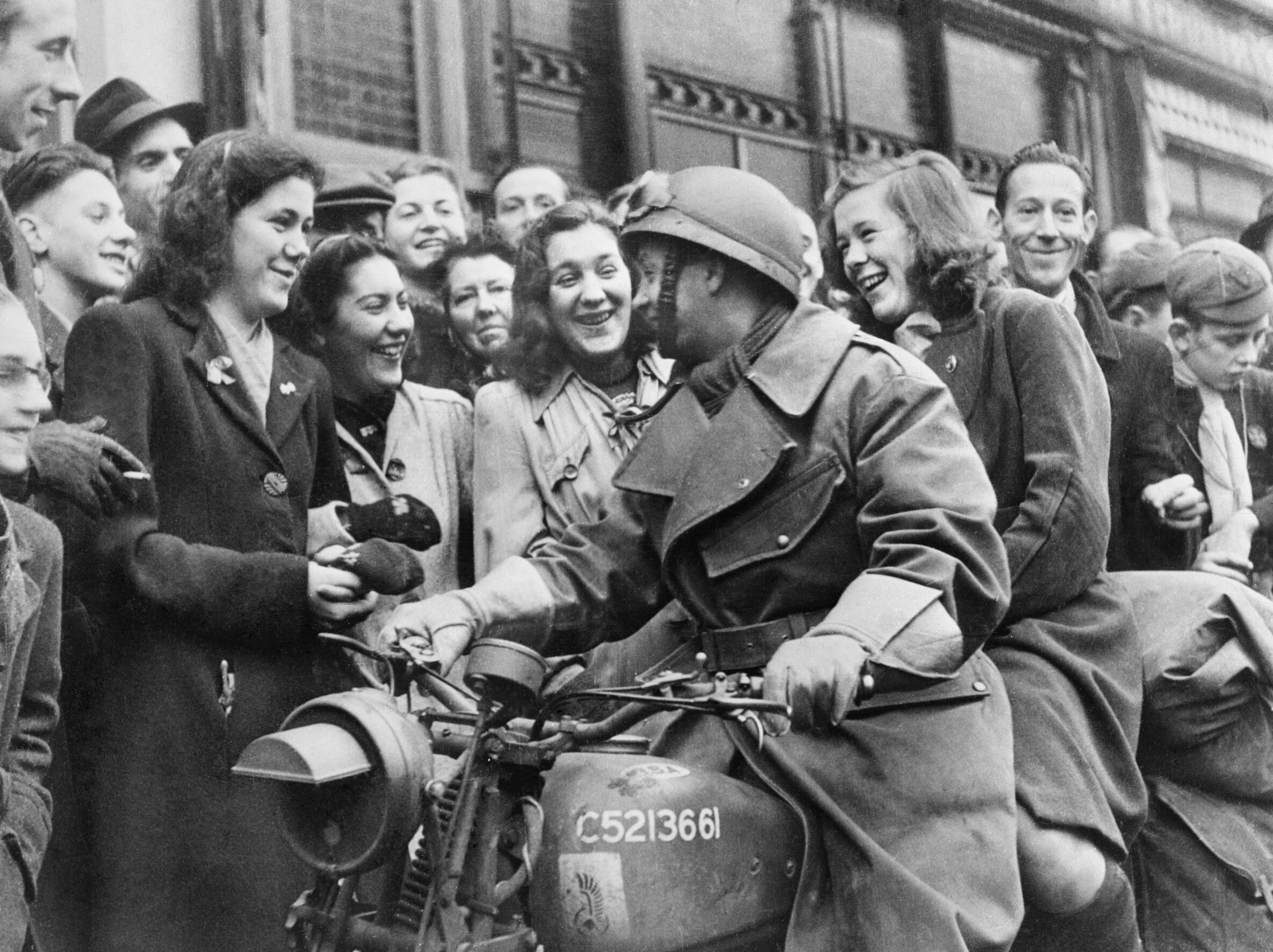
Residents of Breda thank soldiers of the Polish 1st Armoured Division for liberating the city from German occupation (1944)

There were little to no formal connections until the World War II when Nazi Germany launched invasions on both nations. Being victims of Nazi brutality, Poles and Dutch shared common frontier fighting against the Nazis. Dutch prisoners of war were held alike Polish POWs in several German prisoner-of-war camps in Poland, including Stalag II-B, Stalag II-D, Stalag XXI-A, Stalag XXI-C, Stalag XXI-D, Stalag 327, Stalag 357, Stalag 369, Stalag 371, Stalag Luft III, Stalag Luft VII, Oflag VIII-C and Oflag XXI-C. 18 Dutch POWs escaped from the Oflag XXI-C camp in Ostrzeszów, most likely in cooperation with the Polish resistance. Dutch people, alongside Poles and other nationals, were also among the prisoners of the particularly notorious Nazi German camps in Żabikowo, Miłoszyce, Brzeg Dolny, Świecko and Słońsk. The 1st Polish Armoured Division joined as part of the Allies led by the United Kingdom participated in Dutch liberation war against Nazis, and was praised for its valiant efforts on its fight to free both Poland and the Netherlands.

Liberation from German occupation by Polish troops is particularly strongly remembered in Breda. In Breda, there is a Polish military cemetery, where Polish general and war hero Stanisław Maczek is buried, a tank monument, the Polish Monument funded by the residents of Breda in 1954, the Chapel of Our Lady of Częstochowa, a plaque at the city hall, a stained glass window in a 15th-century chapel in the city center, the Maczek Memorial Breda, and two street names referring to Poland and General Maczek, and the anniversary of the liberation is commemorated in the city, also by supporters of the local football club NAC Breda. The city council or Breda granted honorary citizenship to all soldiers of the division.

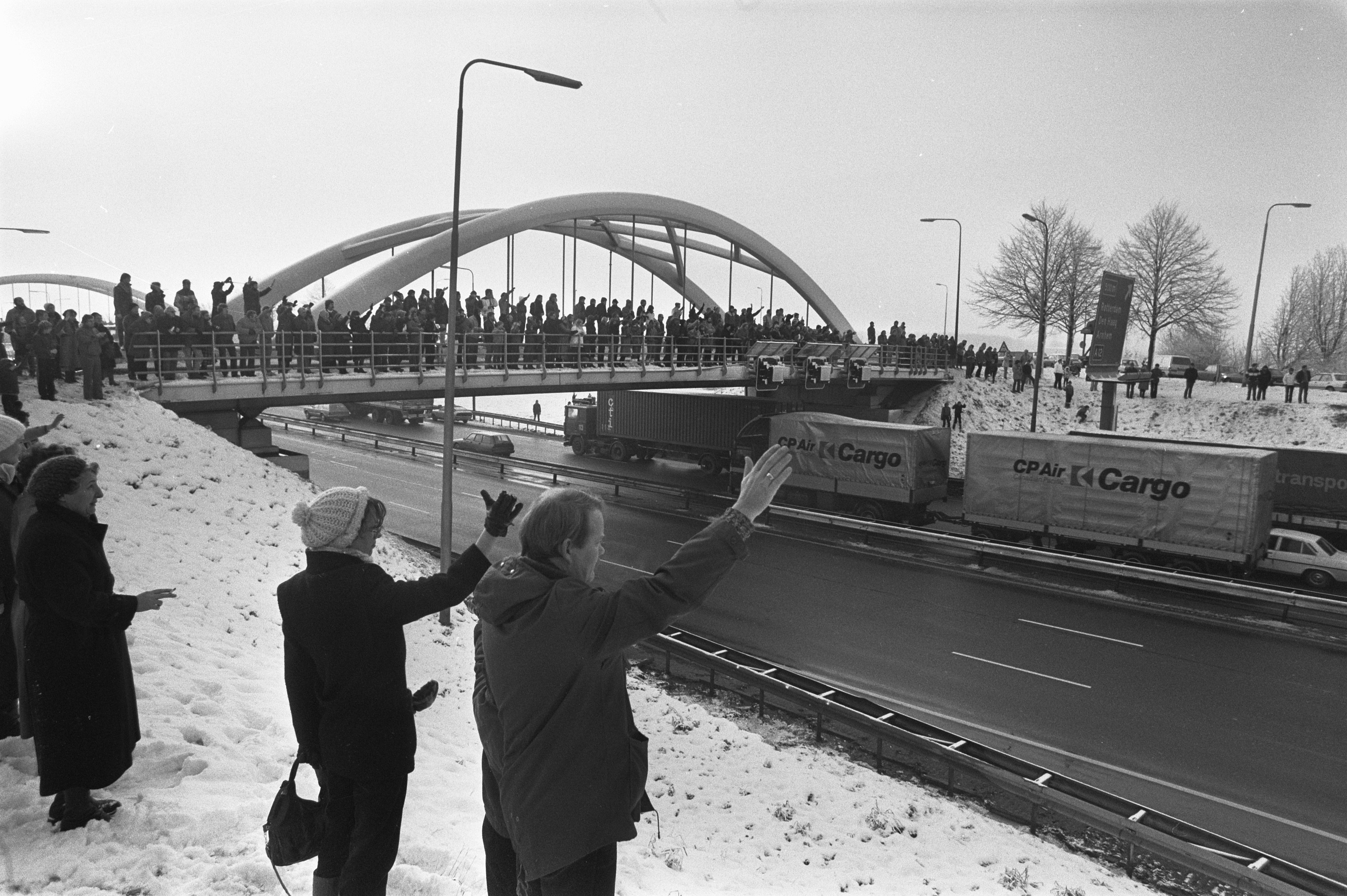
Thousands of residents of Utrecht bid farewell to a convoy of 120 trucks with Christmas packages to Poland (1981)

However, after the World War II, the Netherlands and Poland was completely cut off for the second time, with Poland falling to the communists controlled by the Soviet Union at the Eastern Bloc; while the Netherlands were part of Western Bloc of the Cold War. In the 1970s, economic exchanges resumed and a number of economic treaties were signed between the Netherlands and Poland. Dutchmen supported Solidarity movement to topple the communists in Poland, which was a complete success and overthrowing communist rule in Central and Eastern Europe together.

== Trade ==
The Netherlands is now Poland's no.1 investor among European Union, in total €30,3 billion in 2015. There are about 2,500 enterprises operating in the Polish market with Dutch shareholding that are employing over 120,000 people in Poland.

== Diaspora ==
Polish diaspora exists in the Netherlands, and is perceived well by the Dutch locals. Polish immigrants form the sixth largest immigration group to the Netherlands.

Historically, Poland was home to a sizeable Dutch diaspora. For more, see: Dutch people in Poland.

== the European Union and NATO ==
While the Netherlands was one of the founding members of the EU, Poland joined the EU in 2004. While the Netherlands was one of the founding members of NATO, Poland joined NATO in 1999. The Netherlands fully supported Poland's application to join NATO, which resulted in membership on 12 March 1999, and then the European Union, which resulted in membership on 1 May 2004.

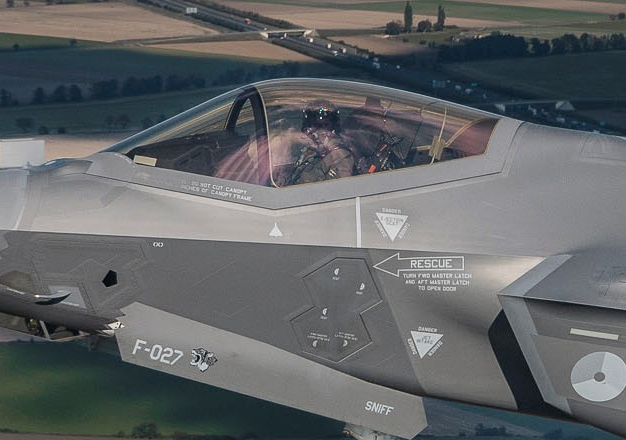
A Dutch F-35 sporting a drone victory marking after shooting down a Russian drone in Poland in 2025

As part of the NATO alliance, Dutch air forces stationed in Poland shot down several Russian drones during the 2025 Russian drone incursion into Poland.

== Resident diplomatic missions ==
- Netherlands has an embassy in Warsaw.
- Poland has an embassy in The Hague.
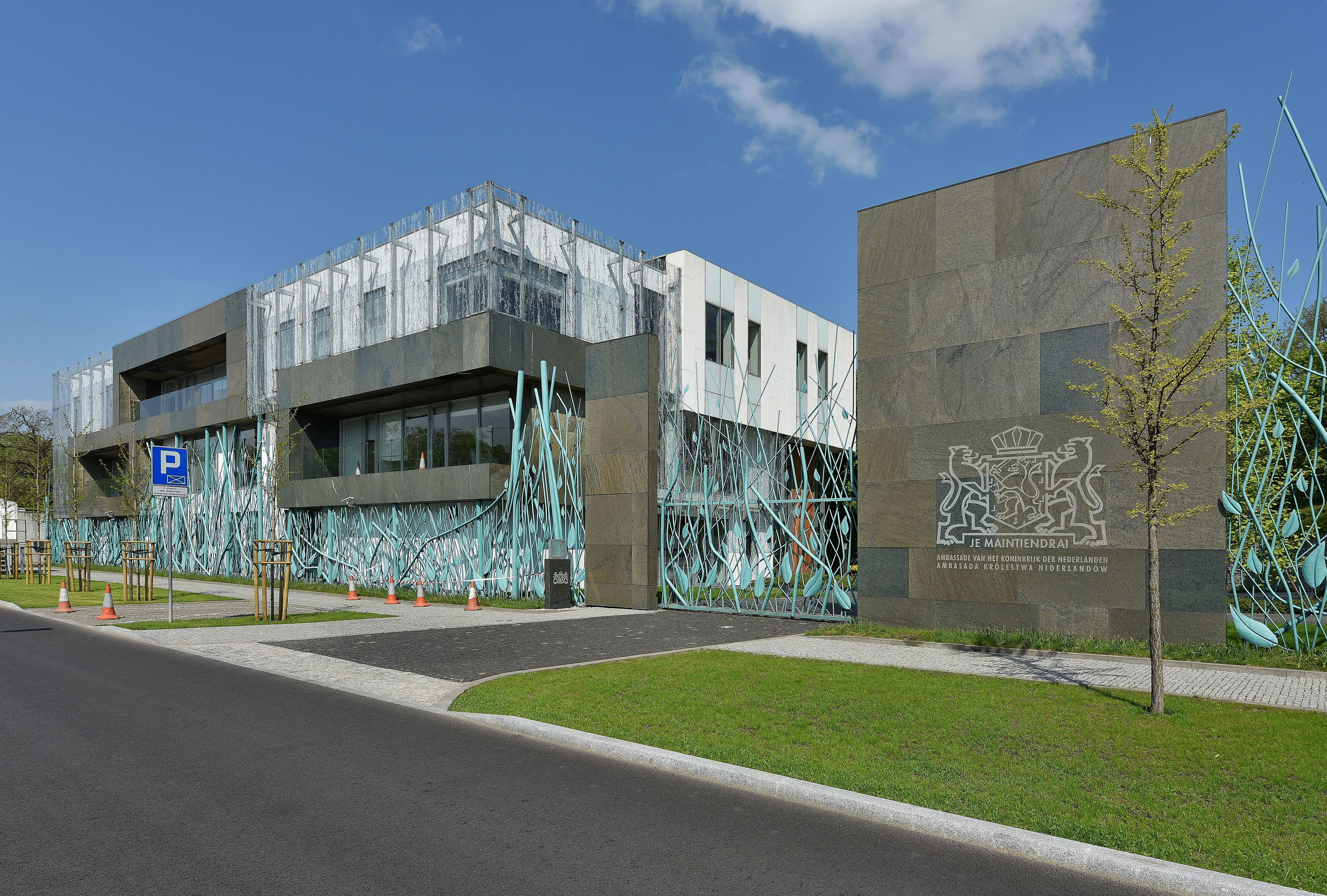
Embassy of the Netherlands in Warsaw

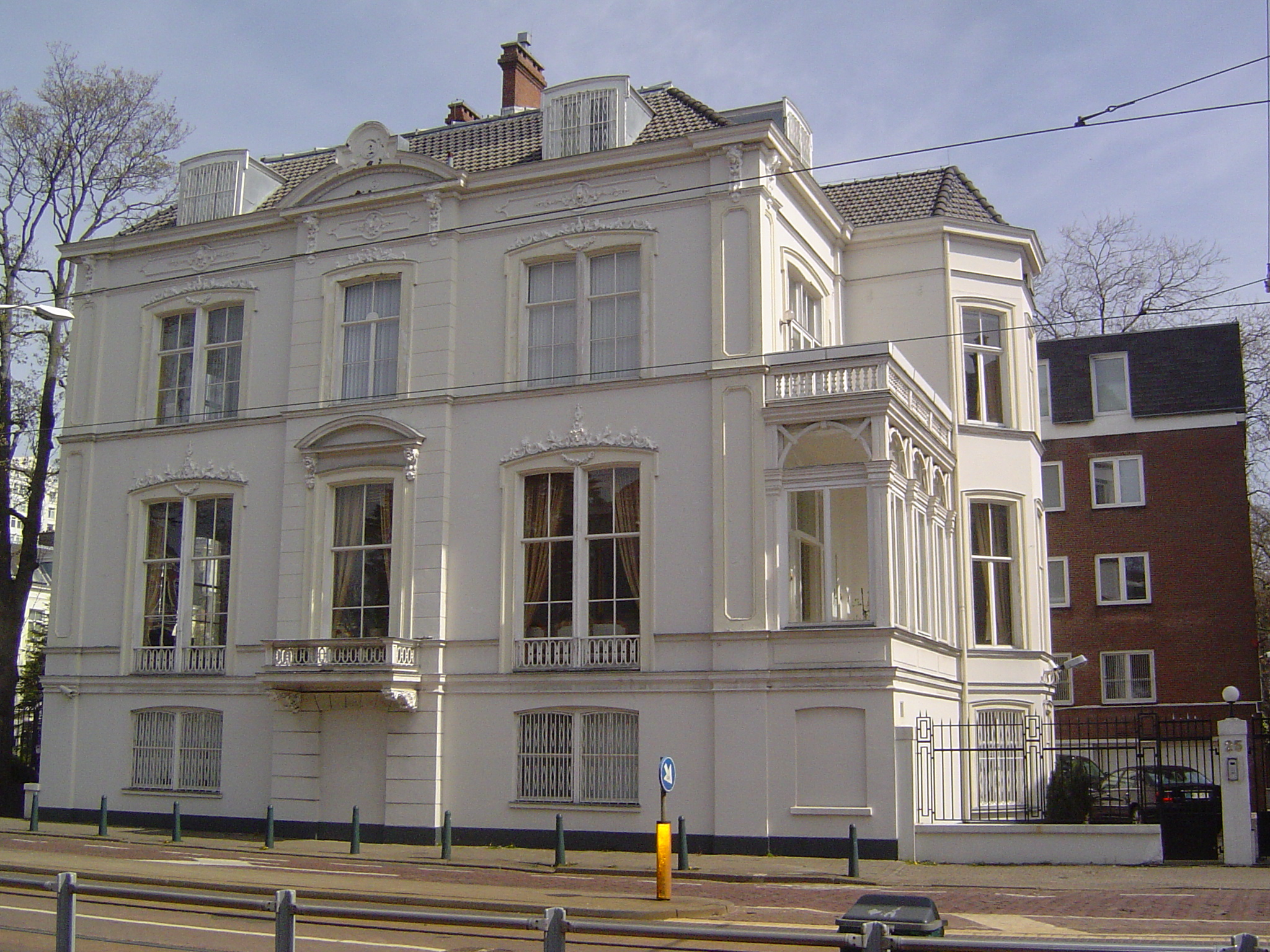
Embassy of Poland in The Hague

== See also ==
- Foreign relations of the Netherlands
- Foreign relations of Poland
- Poles in the Netherlands
- Dutch people in Poland
- Poland in the European Union

== Bibliography ==
- Bogucka, Maria (2011). "Z dziejów stosunków polsko-holenderskich w XVI–XVII wieku". Czasy Nowożytne (in Polish). No. 24.
- Leska-Ślęzak, Joanna (2014). "Holenderska misja gospodarcza w Polsce". Cywilizacja i Polityka (in Polish). No. 12.
