= Dutch Chileans =

People with heritage from Chile and the Netherlands

Dutch Chileans Chileno-neerlandeses Nederlandse Chilenen
Total population
- 50,000

Regions with significant populations
- Frutillar, Valparaíso, Concepcion, Viña del Mar, Santiago, and the highest percentage of Dutch descent lives in Puerto Varas

Languages
- Chilean Spanish, English language, Dutch language, German language

Religion
- mostly Roman Catholicism, but also Reformed Protestantism

Related ethnic groups
- Dutch people, Dutch Argentines, Dutch Brazilians, Dutch diaspora

Dutch Chileans (Spanish: Chileno-neerlandeses; Dutch: Nederlandse Chilenen) are Chilean people of Dutch descent.

== Background ==
In 1600, the Chilean city of Valdivia was conquered by Dutch pirate Sebastian de Cordes. He left the city after a few months. Four decades later, in 1642, the VOC and the WIC sent a fleet of ships to Chile to take control of Valdivia and its Spanish gold mines. The expedition was conducted by Hendrik Brouwer, a Dutch general. In 1643 Brouwer conquered the Chiloé Archipelago and Valdivia. After Brouwer died on 7 August 1643, vice-general Elias Herckmans took control. (The New Flanders Colony).

== Dutch colonization in Chile ==
The second emigration from the Netherlands to Chile occurred in 1895. A dozen Dutch families settled in Chile between 1895 and 1897, particularly in Mechaico, Huillinco and Chacao. Egbert Hageman arrived in Chile with his family, on 14 April 1896, settling in Rio Gato, near Puerto Montt. The Wennekool family inaugurated the Dutch colonization of Villarrica.

In the early twentieth century, a large group of Dutch people arrived in Chile from South Africa. These migrants, after a long stay in African camps, were presented with the opportunity to emigrate to Chile with the help of the Chilean government.

On 4 May 1903, a group of over 200 Dutch sailed on the Pacific Steam Navigation Company steamship Oropesa from La Rochelle (La Pallice) in France. The majority had been born in the Netherlands (35% from North Holland and South Holland, 13% from North Brabant, 9% from Zeeland and an equal number of Gelderland). Only a dozen children had been born in South Africa. On June 5, they arrived by train to the city of Pitrufquén.

Another group of Dutchmen arrived shortly after to Talcahuano, in the Oravi and the Orissa. The Netherlands colony in Donguil was christened "New Transvaal Colony". More than 500 Dutch families moved there. The last group of Boers arrived between 7 February 1907 and February 18, 1909.

Some 50,000 descendants remain, mostly located in Malleco, Gorbea, Pitrufquén, Faja Maisan and around Temuco.

== Notable Dutch Chileans ==
- Jacqueline van Rysselberghe, Chilean Politician
- Alberto van Klaveren, Dutch-born Chilean diplomat
- Shmuel Szteinhendler, rabbi (Regional Director of Masorti Olami Latin America)
- Peter Mociulski von Remenyk, Rock and roll musician
- Denisse van Lamoen, a Chilean archer
- Felipe van de Wyngard, Chilean triathlete
- Cristobal Tapia De Veer, film and television score composer

== See also ==
- German Chileans
- British Chileans
- French Chileans
