= Dutch people in Finland =

Dutch people in Finland Alankomaalaiset Suomessa Nederlanders in Finland
Total population
- c. 2,000

Regions with significant populations
- Helsinki, Espoo

Languages
- Dutch, Finnish and Frisian

Religion
- Christianity (predominantly Protestantism and Catholicism)

Related ethnic groups
- Dutch diaspora

Dutch people in Finland (Finnish: Alankomaalaiset Suomessa; Dutch: Nederlanders in Finland) are immigrants from the Netherlands living in Finland. They numbered around 2,000 in 2017 and live mainly in the cities of Helsinki and Espoo.

== History ==
The Dutch had a significant effect on the development of trade in Finland. Many of them settled permanently in Finland. They also had high positions in the administration of large cities.

== Demographics ==
79.8% of the Dutch immigrants in Finland are men. 663 Dutch men are in a registered relationship with a Finnish woman. There are 1,082 male Dutch citizens, which means that over 61% of Dutch men in Finland are in a registered relationship with a Finnish woman. 148 Dutch citizens were naturalized between 1990 and 2017, with 22 in 2017. A total of 5,394 people immigrated from the Netherlands to Finland between 1990 and 2017, with 275 in 2017. Over 400 Dutch immigrants live in Helsinki and over 200 in Espoo. There are 541 Finnish-Dutch dual citizens. 52% are non-religious and 48% are Christian.

== Employment ==
Dutch citizens were the second most employed group in Finland in 2008 after Kenyans, at 60.2%, compared to Finnish citizens at 44.7%. There were over 100 Dutch entrepreneurs in 2017. Over 33% were outside the labour force, and 6.4% pensioners.

== Society ==
Around 300 Dutch people living in Finland celebrated the new king in 2013.

== Notable people ==
- Thomas Lam, footballer
- Koop Arponen, singer
- George de Godzinsky, composer and conductor
- Kristian Meurman, singer
- Matthias Versluis, figure skater

== See also ==
- Finland–Netherlands relations
- Dutch diaspora
- Immigration to Finland
