= Finland–Netherlands relations =

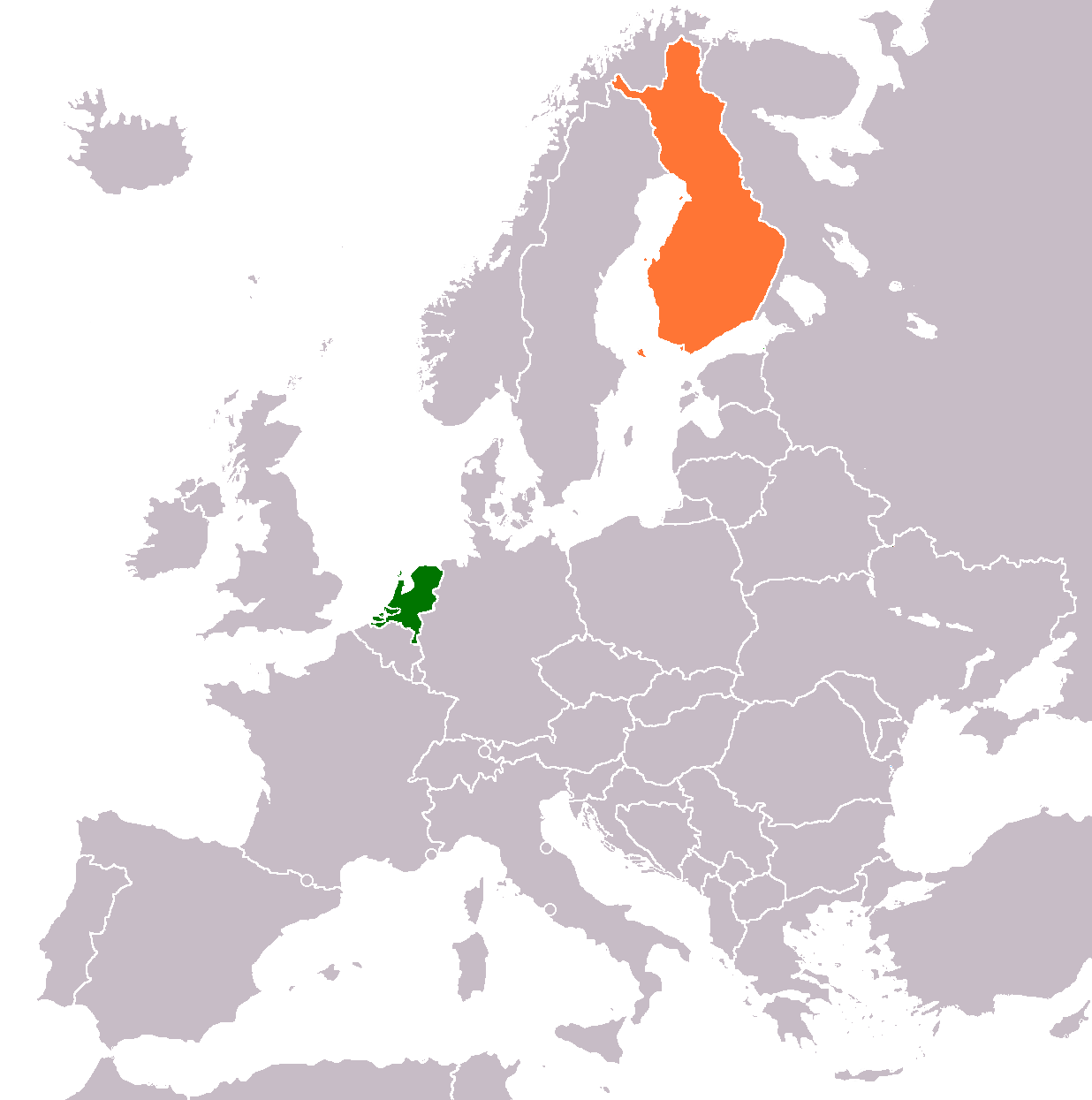
- Netherlands: Finland

Diplomatic mission
- Embassy of the Netherlands, Helsinki: Embassy of Finland, The Hague

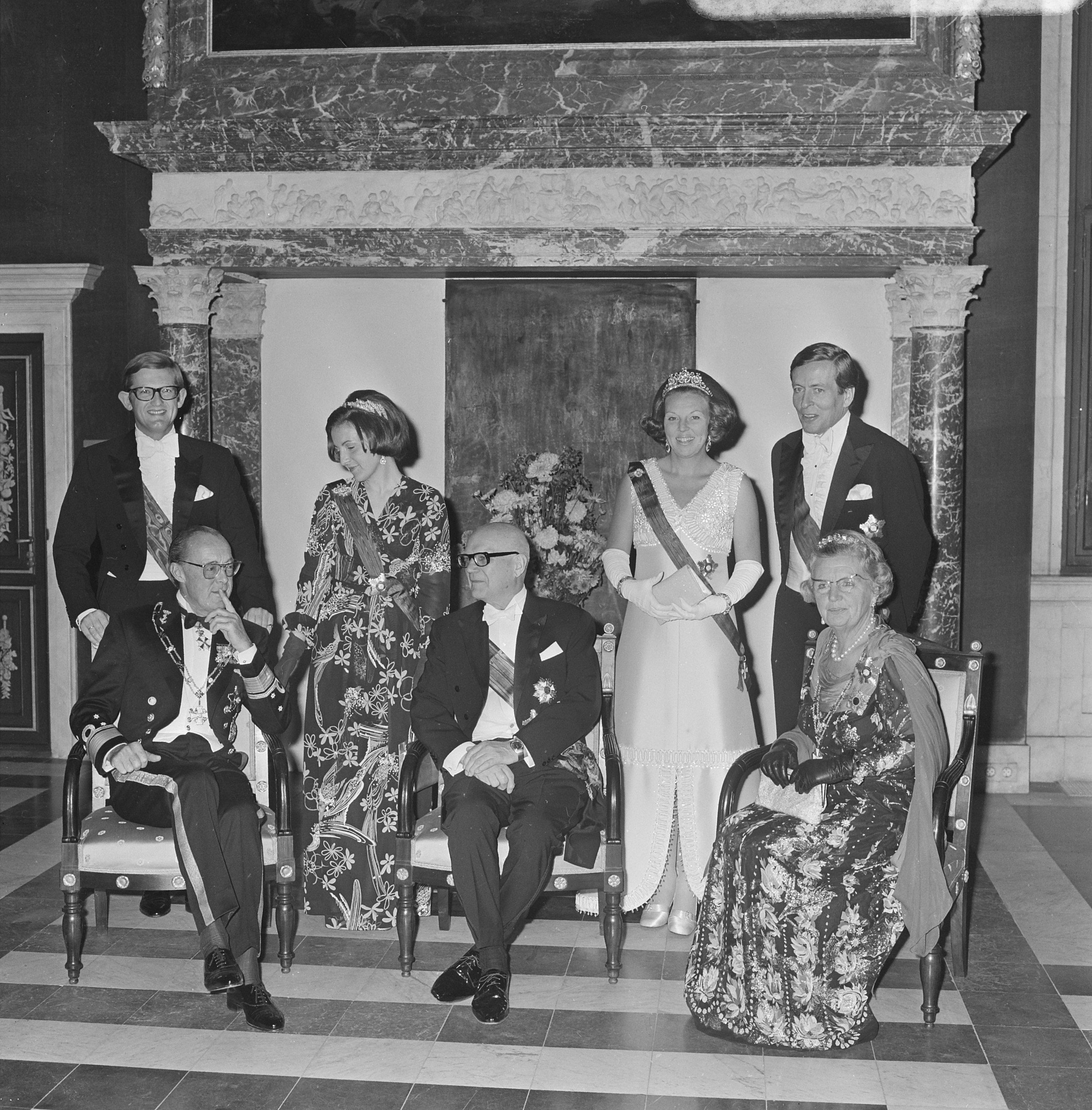
President Urho Kekkonen, Queen Juliana, Prince Bernhard, Beatrix, Claus von Amsberg, Princess Margriet and Pieter van Vollenhoven in 1972

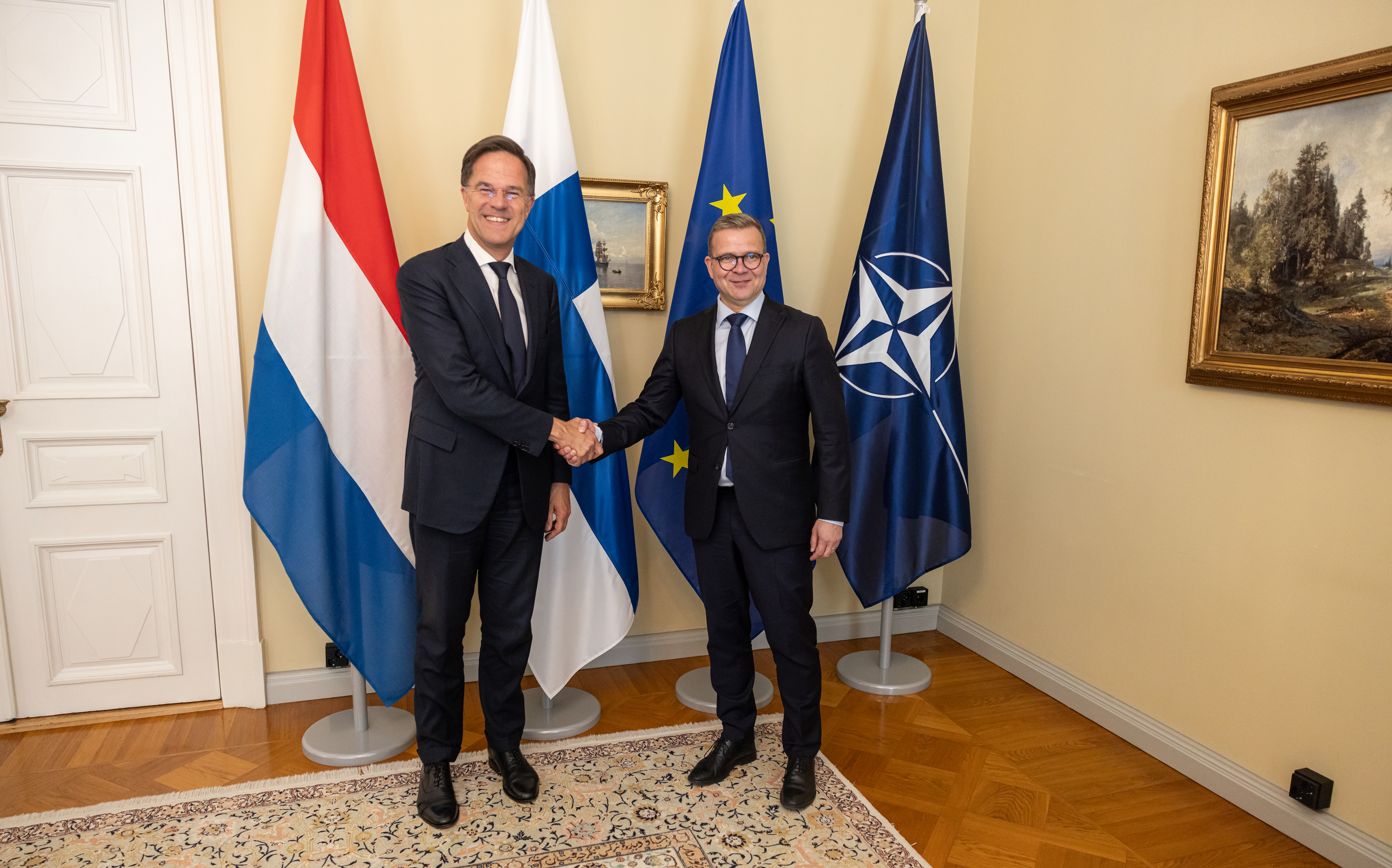
Dutch Prime Minister Mark Rutte meets with Finnish Prime Minister Petteri Orpo in Helsinki, 13 June 2024

Finland–Netherlands relations are the bilateral relations between the Netherlands and Finland. The Netherlands recognised Finland's independence on 28 January 1918. Diplomatic relations between them were established on 14 August 1918. The Netherlands has an embassy in Helsinki Finland has an embassy in the Hague, Both countries are full members of the COE, Joint Expeditionary Force, EU and NATO. On 18 May 2022, the Netherlands announced that they welcomed the applications of Finland and Sweden to join NATO and that they would fully support their membership. The Netherlands supported Finland's NATO membership during Finland's accession into NATO, which was finalized on 4 April 2023. And Netherlands is Observer bureau of the BEAC, CBSS and AC.

== Resident diplomatic missions ==
- Finland has an embassy in The Hague.
- the Netherlands has an embassy in Helsinki.
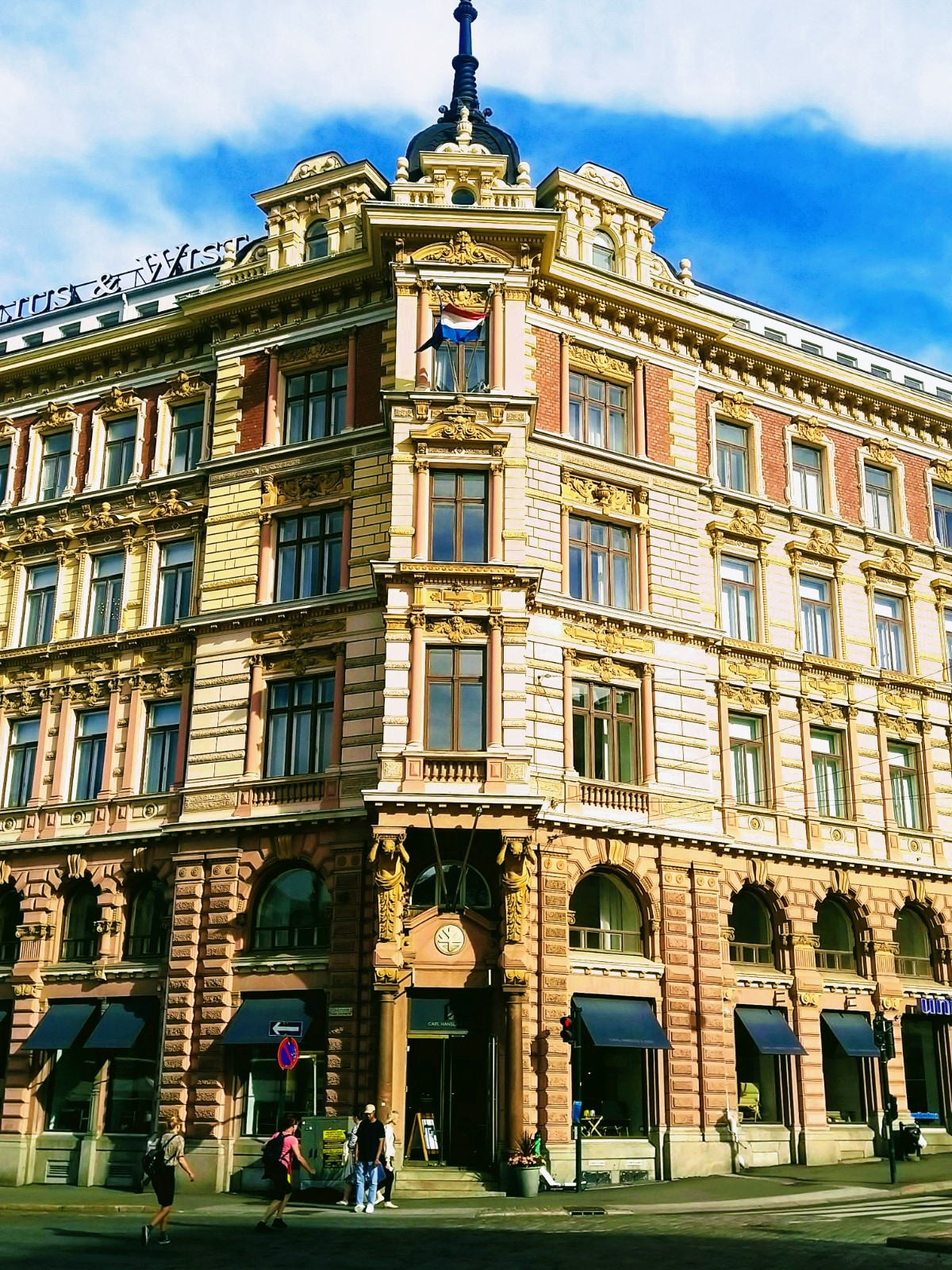
Embassy of the Netherlands in Helsinki

== See also ==
- Foreign relations of Finland
- Foreign relations of the Netherlands
- Dutch people in Finland
