= Argentina–Netherlands relations =

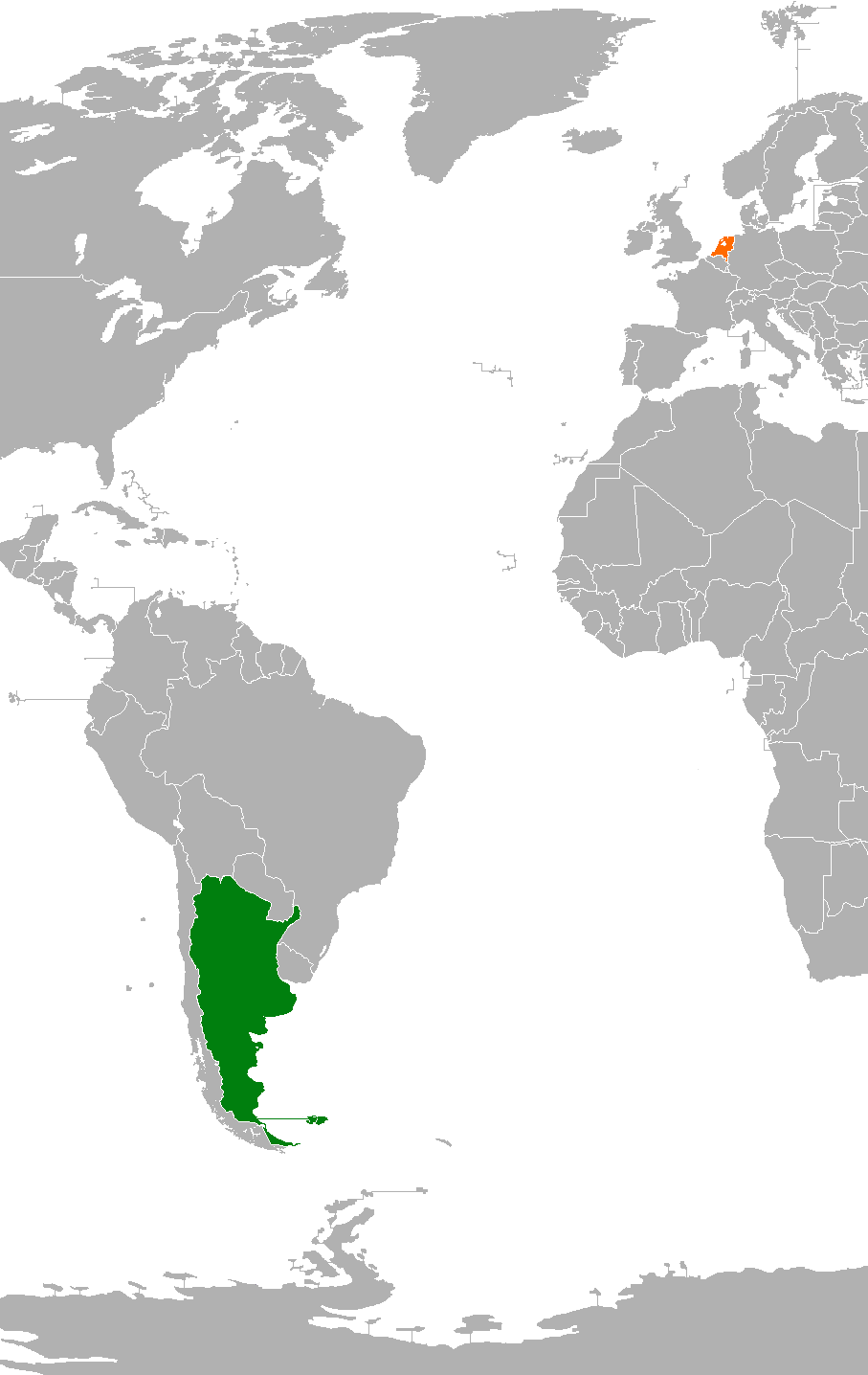
- Argentina: Netherlands

Argentina–Netherlands relations refers to the diplomatic relations between the Argentine Republic and the Kingdom of the Netherlands. Argentina has an embassy in The Hague. the Netherlands has an embassy in Buenos Aires. Both nations are members of the United Nations.

== Trade ==
The Argentine-Dutch Chamber of Commerce was founded in 1919. It is a non-profit entity with legal status and registered office in the Republic of Argentina. The main objective of the Chamber is to protect the commercial interests of its members, both as a whole and as those of individual members. The Chamber is a member of the Union of Foreign and Binational Chambers of Commerce. Its second objective is to provide services to Dutch companies wishing to establish commercial relations with Argentina and to Argentine companies seeking to establish commercial relations with the Netherlands.

== Diaspora ==
Argentina received important contingents of Dutch people from 1825 onwards. Today the largest Dutch community is in the city of Tres Arroyos in the south of the province of Buenos Aires. The Dutch Association is an independent entity founded around 1920. The Association organizes various traditional Dutch festivities in Argentina. Among its activities the Association distributes the only Dutch-language magazine in Argentina: the "Blad Nederland", which is published 8 times a year and has a circulation of around 350 copies.

== Resident dipomatic missions ==
- Argentina has an embassy in The Hague.
- The Netherlands have an embassy on Buenos Aires.
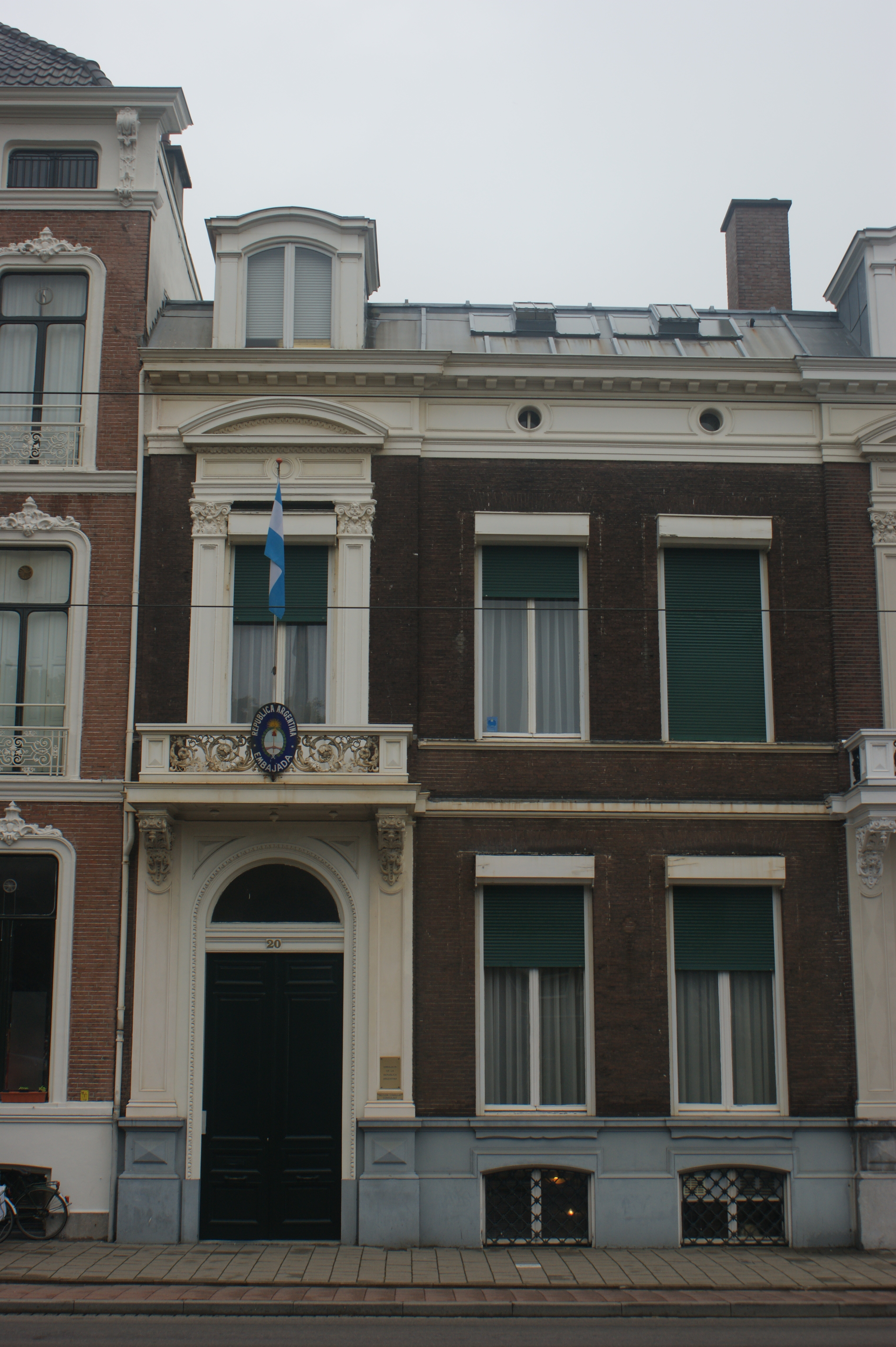
Embassy of Argentina in The Hague

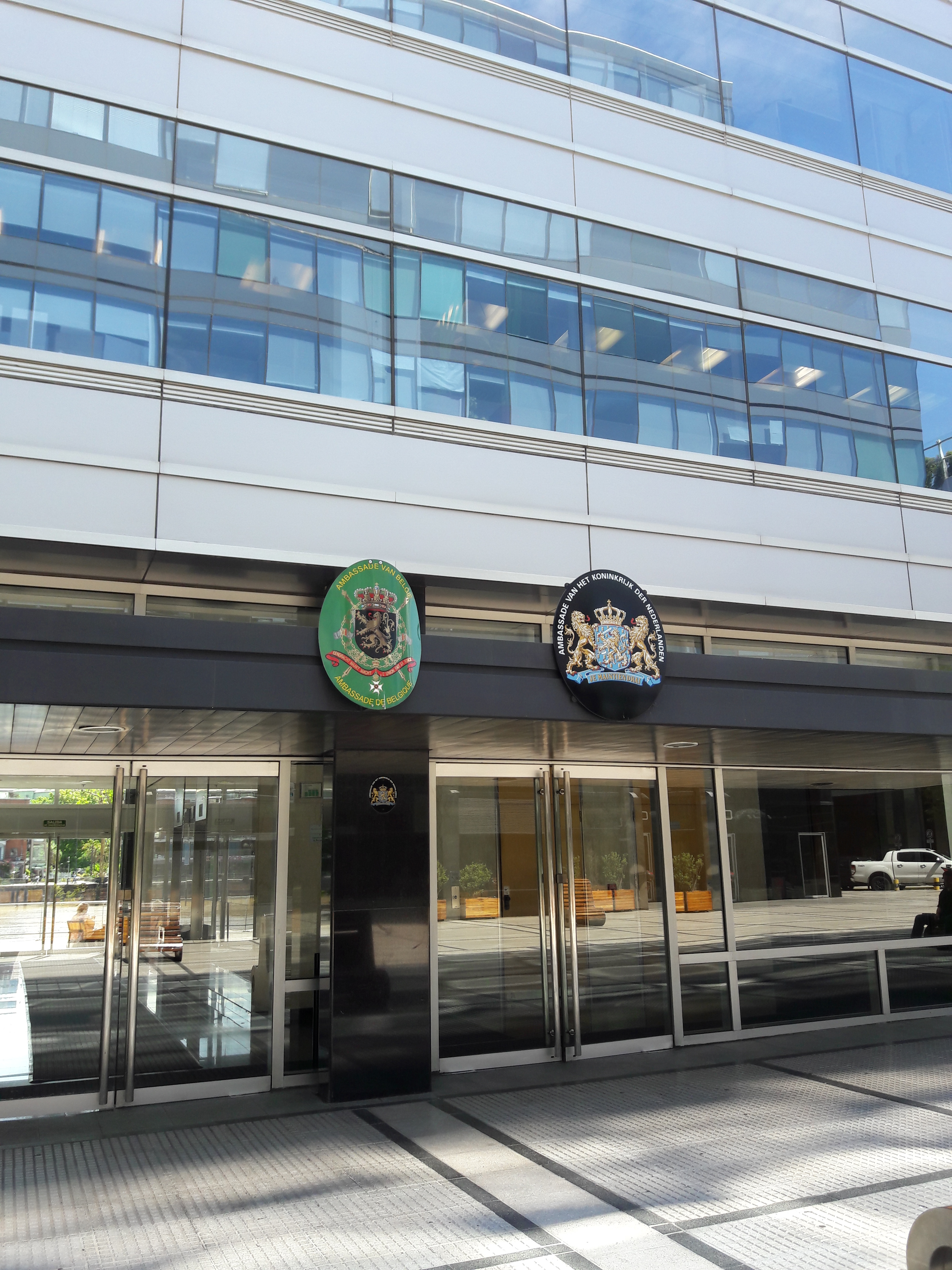
Embassy of the Netherlands in Buenos Aires

== See also ==
- Dutch Argentines
- Argentina–Netherlands football rivalry
