= Dutch Argentines =

Ethnic group in Argentina

Nederlandse Argentijnen (Dutch) Neerlando-argentinos (Spanish)
- (Argentina) (Netherlands)
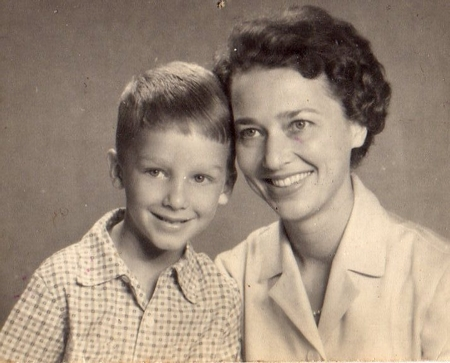
- Dutch immigrants in 1950

Total population
- 300,000-400,000

Languages
- Spanish • Dutch

Religion
- Majority: Protestantism; Minority: Catholicism · Irreligion

Related ethnic groups
- Dutch; Dutch Brazilians; Dutch Americans; Dutch Chilean; Dutch Australians; Dutch Canadians; Dutch New Zealanders

Dutch Argentines (Spanish: Neerlando-argentinos; Dutch: Nederlandse Argentijnen) are Argentine citizens of full or partial Dutch ancestry or people who emigrated from the Netherlands and reside in Argentina.

Dutch immigration to Argentina has been one of many migration flows from Europe in that country, although it has not been as numerous as in other cases (they failed to account for 1% of total migration received). However, Argentina received a large contingent of Dutch since 1825. The largest community is in the city of Tres Arroyos in the south of the province of Buenos Aires.

There are between 300,000 and 400,000 people of Dutch origin in Argentina, the Dutch community in Argentina is one of the biggest in the world.

== See also ==
- Argentina–Netherlands relations
- Argentines of European descent
- French Argentines
- English Argentines
- German Argentines
