= Mykhailyn, Vinnytsia Oblast =

Village in Vinnytsia Oblast, Ukraine

Mykhailyn Михайлин
- Village
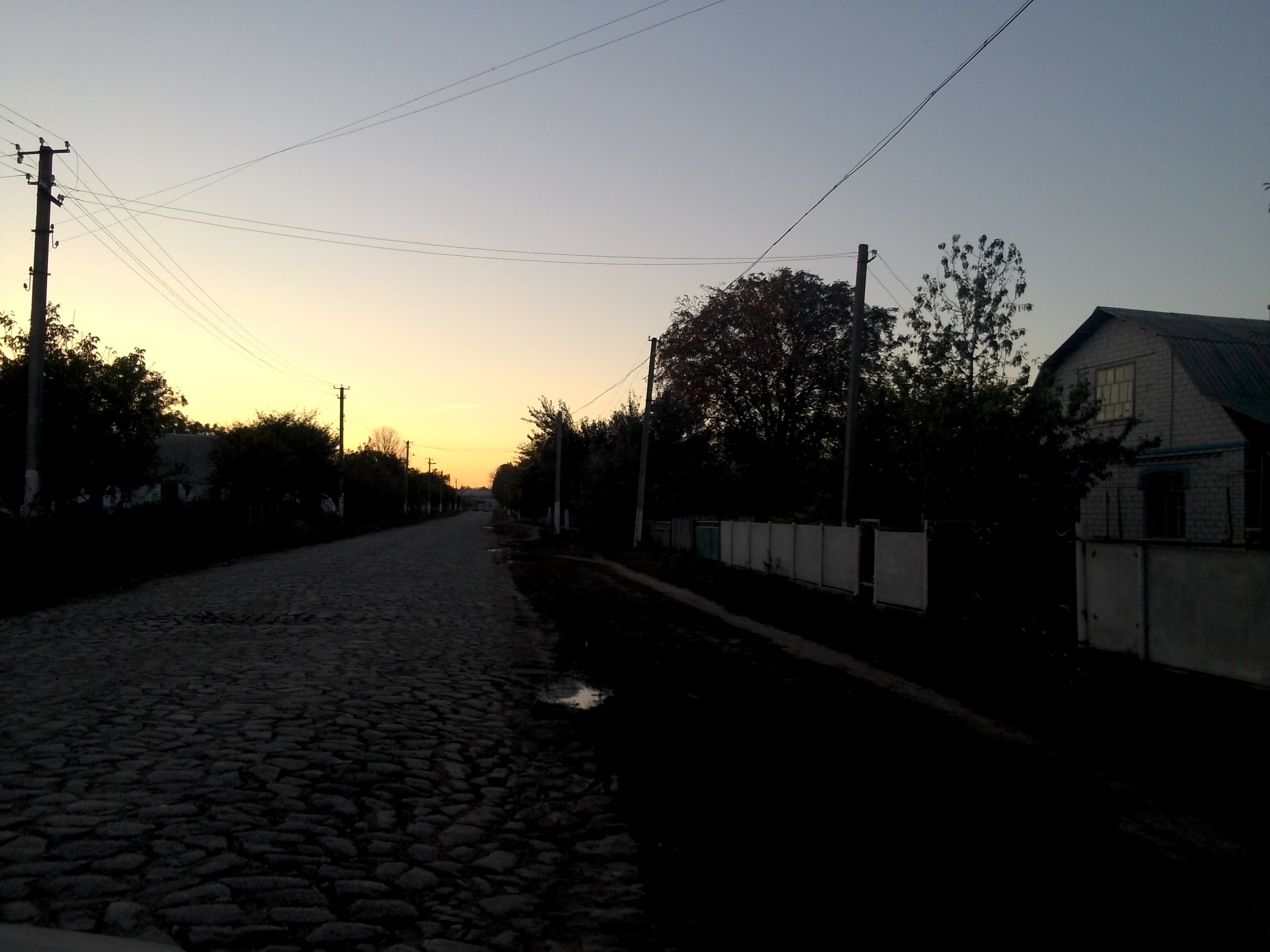

- Location within Ukraine
- Coordinates: 49°35′8″N 28°48′13″E
- Country: Ukraine
- Oblast: Vinnytsia
- District: Khmilnyk Raion
- Time zone: UTC+2 (EET)
  - Summer (DST): UTC+3 (EEST)
- Postal code: 22162

Mykhailyn (Ukrainian: Михайлин, Polish: Michalin) is a village in the administrative district of Khmilnyk Raion, in Vinnytsia Oblast, in central Ukraine.

== History ==
Michalin, as it was known in Polish, was a private village of the Potocki family, administratively located in the Lesser Poland Province of the Kingdom of Poland. In 1791, Mennonites were settled in the village by Antoni Protazy Potocki, and granted privileges by the Potockis and the Polish government.

Following the Second Partition of Poland, the village was annexed by Russia, within which it was administratively located in the Berdichev uezd in the Kyiv Governorate.
