= Faja Maisan =

Coordinates: 39°02′39.41″S 72°54′48.3″W

- Town
- Location in Chile
- Country: Chile
- Region: La Araucanía
- Province: Cautín
- Commune: Pitrufquén

Faja Maisan is a coastal town located in the Chilean commune of Pitrufquén, Araucanía Region. Formed mostly by descendants of Germans, Dutch and Swiss, whose grandparents came to the Araucanía between 1905 and 1912.

== History ==
Nowadays, the most important community of foreigners is settled in Faja Maisan. It is made up mainly of German and Swiss descendants whose ancestors arrived in La Araucanía between 1905 and 1912.

On September 5, 1905 Arrival of early settlers from Germany and the Netherlands. They arrived in Chile through, mediation of Mr. Max Maysan, which previously had come from the Netherlands to Chiloé.

In 1912 the last settlers arrived from Switzerland and the Netherlands.

== Economy ==
The main productive activities are concentrated in the areas livestock, agriculture, forestry and industry.

== See also ==
- Immigration to Chile
