= Dutch culture =

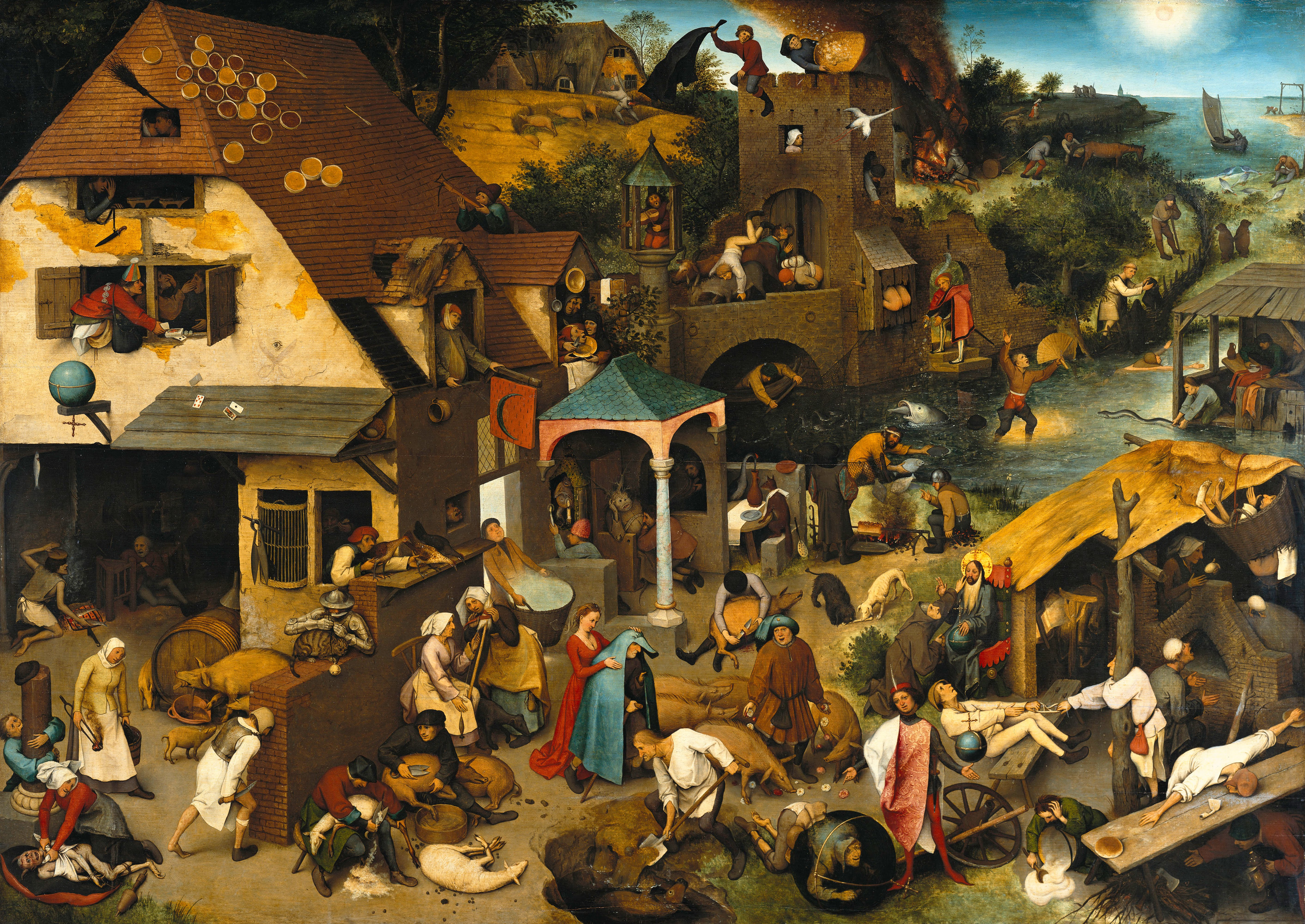
Netherlandish Proverbs, by Pieter Bruegel the Elder. (1559)

Dutch culture may refer to:

- used more narrowly, the Culture of the Netherlands
- used more widely, the culture of Dutch-speaking Europe, including:
  - Dutch architecture
  - Dutch literature
  - Dutch music
  - Dutch festivities
  - Dutch folklore

== See also ==
- Dutch people
- The Netherlands
- Flanders (Belgium)
