= Dutch people =

Ethnic group native to the Netherlands

Dutch
Nederlanders
- Flag of the Netherlands, the ethnic flag of the Dutch people and the flag of their nation state

Total population
- c. 20–30 million^{[a]} Dutch diaspora and ancestry: c. 14 million

Regions with significant populations
- Netherlands 16,366,000 (self-identified ethnic Dutch and those legally treated as Dutch, e.g. Moluccans per Faciliteitenwet)
- United States^{[b]}: 3,683,000
- South Africa^{[b]}^{[d]}: 3,000,000
- Canada^{[b]}: 1,112,000
- Australia^{[b]}: 382,000
- Germany: 257,000
- Belgium^{[b]}: 121,000
- New Zealand^{[b]}: 100,000
- France: 60,000
- United Kingdom: 56,000
- Spain: 48,000
- Denmark: 30,000
- Switzerland: 20,000
- Indonesia: 17,000
- Sweden: 16,829
- Turkey: 15,000
- Curaçao: 14,000
- Norway: 13,000
- Italy: 13,000
- Portugal: 12,000
- Israel: 5,000
- Aruba: 5,000
- Luxembourg: 5,000
- Hungary: 4,000
- Austria: 3,200
- Poland: 3,000
- Suriname: 3,000
- South Korea: 2,676
- Japan: 1,805
- Greece: 1,000
- Thailand: 1,000

Languages
- Primarily Dutch and other regional languages: Dutch Low Saxon (Note: Dutch Low Saxon, a variety of Low German spoken in northeastern Netherlands, is used by people who ethnically identify as "Dutch" despite perceived linguistic differences.); Limburgish (Note: Limburgish, a Low Franconian variety in close proximity to both Dutch and German, spoken in southeastern Netherlands is used by people who ethnically identify as Dutch or Flemings and regionally as "Limburgers" despite perceived linguistic differences.); West Frisian (Friesland) (Note: West Frisian is spoken by the ethnic Frisians, who may or may not also identify as "Dutch".); English (BES Islands) (Note: The Caribbean Netherlands are treated as a municipality of the Netherlands and the inhabitants are considered in law and practice to be "Dutch", even if they might not identify as such personally.); Papiamento (Bonaire) (Note: Papiamento, a Portuguese-based creole, is spoken by Arubans and Curaçaoans who may ethnically further also identify as "Dutch".)

Religion
- Predominantly irreligious (particularly atheist and agnostic); Historically or traditionally Christian (Latin Catholic and Protestant)^{[c]}

Related ethnic groups
- Afrikaners; Flemings; Frisians
- ^a Including 16 million self-identified ethnically Dutch inhabitants of the Netherlands, 2 million (at most) living abroad, and another 14–15 million who declare Dutch ancestry worldwide, including expatriates. (Note: In the 1950s (the peak of traditional emigration) about 350,000 people left the Netherlands, mainly to Australia, New Zealand, Canada, the United States, Argentina and South Africa. About one-fifth returned. The maximum Dutch-born emigrant stock for the 1950s is about 300,000 (some have died since). The maximum emigrant stock (Dutch-born) for the period after 1960 is 1.6 million. Discounting pre-1950 emigrants (who would be about 85 or older), at most around 2 million people born in the Netherlands are now living outside the country. Combined with the 13.2 million ethnically Dutch inhabitants of the Netherlands (both parents born in the Netherlands), there are about 16 million people who are Dutch (of Dutch ancestry), in a minimally accepted sense. Autochtone population at 1 January 2006, Central Statistics Bureau, Integratiekaart 2006, (in Dutch)); ^b Predominantly of Dutch ancestry.; ^c Dutch Protestants are mainly Reformed (Calvinist), with notable Lutheran minorities. Roman Catholics also form a sizable minority, especially in the south on the border with Flanders, a traditional Catholic stronghold.; ^d In South Africa, most Afrikaners and Coloureds (Cape Coloureds) trace their ancestry to the Netherlands, being descendants of Dutch colonisers, who established the Dutch Cape Colony. They speak Afrikaans as their native language, which is a mutually intelligible sister language of Dutch that developed in the Colony.

The Dutch (Note: Also known by the unused term Netherlanders) (Dutch: Nederlanders) are an ethnic group native to the Netherlands. They share a common ancestry and culture and speak the Dutch language. Dutch people and their descendants are found in migrant communities worldwide, notably in Argentina, Aruba, Australia, Brazil, Canada, Caribbean Netherlands, Curaçao, Germany, Guyana, Indonesia, New Zealand, Sint Maarten, South Africa, Suriname, and the United States. The Low Countries were situated around the border of France and the Holy Roman Empire, forming a part of their respective peripheries and the various territories of which they consisted had become virtually autonomous by the 13th century. Under the Habsburgs, the Netherlands were organised into a single administrative unit, and in the 16th and 17th centuries the Northern Netherlands gained independence from Spain as the Dutch Republic. The high degree of urbanisation characteristic of Dutch society was attained at a relatively early date. During the Republic the first series of large-scale Dutch migrations outside of Europe took place.

The traditional arts and culture of the Dutch encompasses various forms of traditional music, dances, architectural styles and clothing, some of which are globally recognisable. Internationally, Dutch painters such as Rembrandt, Vermeer and Van Gogh are held in high regard. The predominant religion among the Dutch is Christianity, encompassing both Latin Catholicism and Calvinist Protestantism. However, in contemporary times, the majority no longer adhere to a particular Christian denomination. Significant percentages of the Dutch are adherents of humanism, agnosticism, atheism or individual spirituality.

== History ==
=== Emergence ===
In the first centuries CE, the Germanic tribes formed tribal societies with no apparent form of autocracy (chiefs only being elected in times of war), had religious beliefs based on Germanic paganism and spoke a dialect still closely resembling Common Germanic. Following the end of the migration period in the West around 500, with large federations (such as the Franks, Vandals, Alamanni and Saxons) settling the decaying Roman Empire, a series of monumental changes took place within these Germanic societies. Among the most important of these are their conversion from Germanic paganism to Christianity, the emergence of a new political system, centered on kings, and a continuing process of emerging mutual unintelligibility of their various dialects.

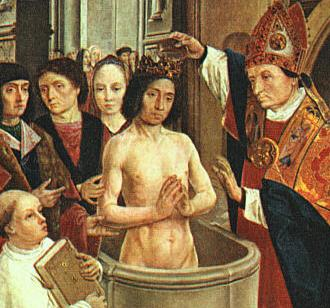
The conversion of the Frankish king Clovis to Christianity would have great significance in helping shape the identity of the future Dutch people.

The general situation described above is applicable to most if not all modern European ethnic groups with origins among the Germanic tribes, such as the Frisians, Germans, English and the Nordic (Scandinavian) peoples. In the Low Countries, this phase began when the Franks, themselves a union of multiple smaller tribes (many of them, such as the Batavi, Chauci, Chamavi and Chattuarii, were already living in the Low Countries prior to the forming of the Frankish confederation), began to incur the northwestern provinces of the Roman Empire. Eventually, in 358, the Salian Franks, one of the three main subdivisions among the Frankish alliance, settled the area's Southern lands as foederati; Roman allies in charge of border defense.

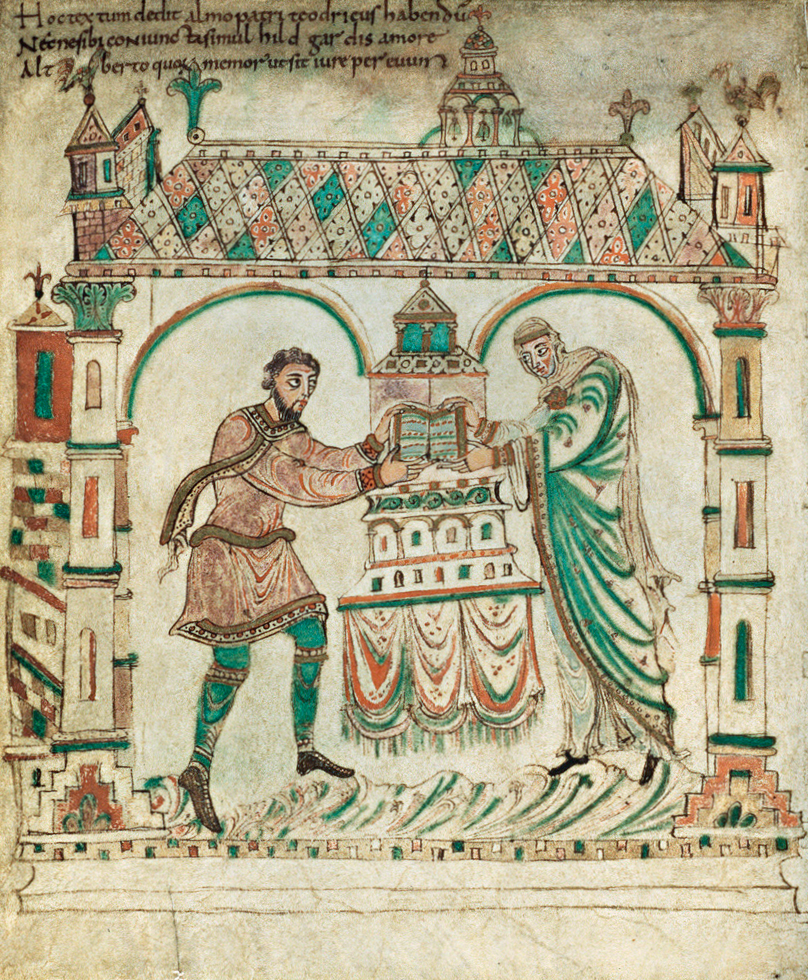
The Egmond Gospels contains the oldest known depiction of Dutch individuals, the count Dirk II of Holland and his wife Hildegard of Flanders.

Linguistically Old Frankish gradually evolved into Old Dutch, which was first attested in the 6th century, whereas religiously the Franks (beginning with the upper class) converted to Christianity from around 500 to 700. On a political level, the Frankish warlords abandoned tribalism and founded a number of kingdoms, eventually culminating in the Frankish Empire of Charlemagne.

However, the population make-up of the Frankish Empire, or even early Frankish kingdoms such as Neustria and Austrasia, was not dominated by Franks. Though the Frankish leaders controlled most of Western Europe, the Franks themselves were confined to the Northwestern part (i.e. the Rhineland, the Low Countries and Northern France) of the Empire. Eventually, the Franks in Northern France were assimilated by the general Gallo-Roman population, and took over their dialects (which became French), whereas the Franks in the Low Countries retained their language, which would evolve into Dutch. The current Dutch-French language border has (with the exception of the Nord-Pas-de-Calais in France and Brussels and the surrounding municipalities in Belgium) remained virtually identical ever since, and could be seen as marking the furthest pale of gallicisation among the Franks. A dialect continuum remaining with more eastern Germanic populations, a distinct identity in relation to these only gradually developed, largely based on socio-economic and political factors.

=== Convergence ===
The medieval cities of the Low Countries, especially those of Flanders, Brabant and Holland, which experienced major growth during the 11th and 12th centuries, were instrumental in breaking down the already relatively loose local form of feudalism. As they became increasingly powerful, they used their economic strength to influence the politics of their nobility. During the early 14th century, beginning in and inspired by the County of Flanders, the cities in the Low Countries gained huge autonomy and generally dominated or greatly influenced the various political affairs of the fief, including marriage succession.

While the cities were of great political importance, they also formed catalysts for medieval Dutch culture. Trade flourished, population numbers increased dramatically, and (advanced) education was no longer limited to the clergy. Flanders, Brabant and Holland began to develop a common Dutch standard language. Dutch epic literature such as Elegast (1150), the Roelantslied and Van den vos Reynaerde (1200) were widely enjoyed. The various city guilds as well as the necessity of water boards (in charge of dikes, canals, etc.) in the Dutch delta and coastal regions resulted in an exceptionally high degree of communal organisation. It is also around this time, that ethnonyms such as Diets and Nederlands emerge.

In the second half of the 14th century, the dukes of Burgundy gained a foothold in the Low Countries through the marriage in 1369 of Philip the Bold of Burgundy to the heiress of the Count of Flanders. This was followed by a series of marriages, wars, and inheritances among the other Dutch fiefs and around 1450 the most important fiefs were under Burgundian rule, while complete control was achieved after the end of the Guelders Wars in 1543, thereby unifying the fiefs of the Low Countries under one ruler. This process marked a new episode in the development of the Dutch ethnic group, as now political unity started to emerge, consolidating the strengthened cultural and linguistic unity.

=== Consolidation ===
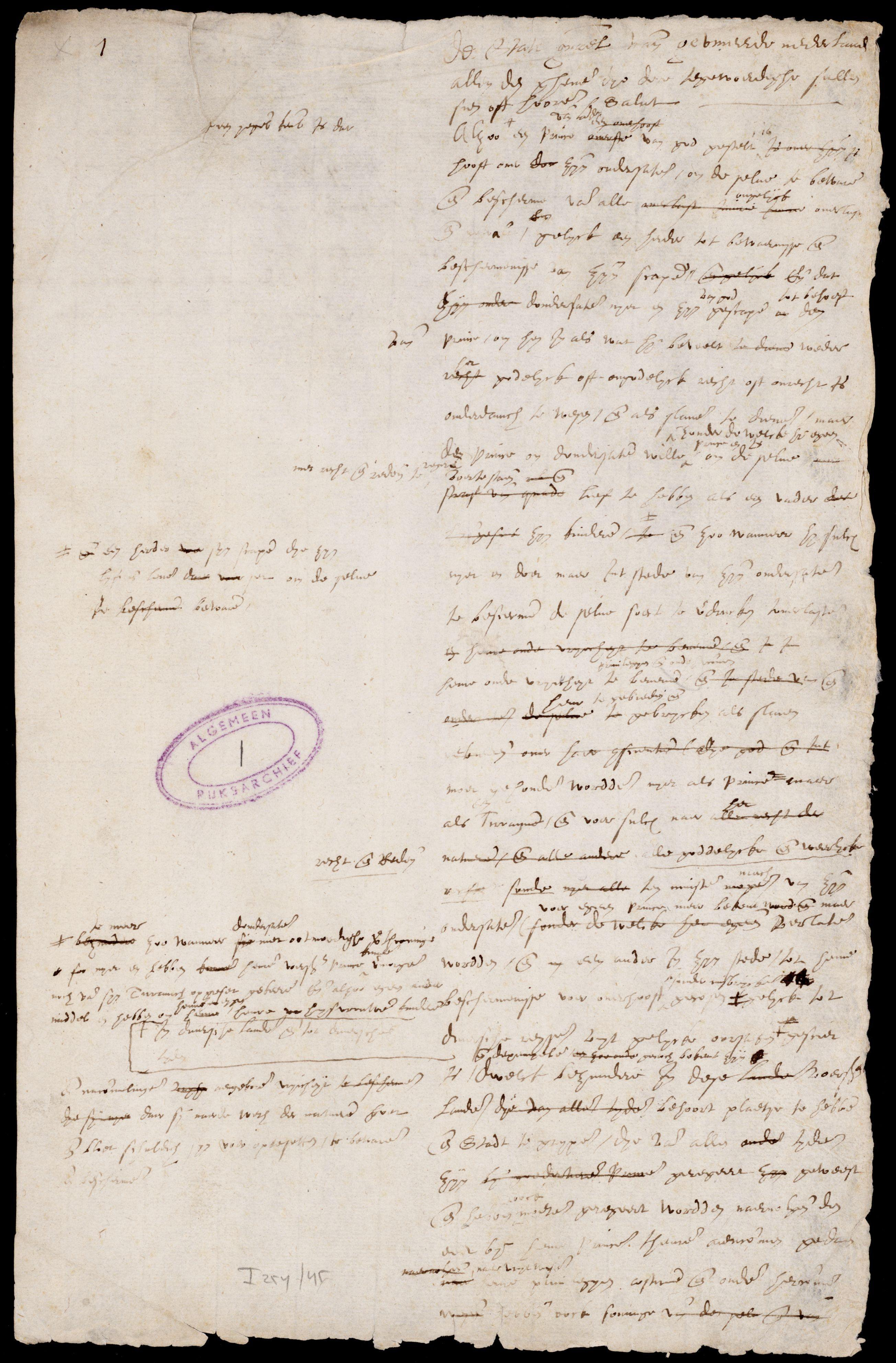
The Act of Abjuration, signed on 26 July 1581, was the formal declaration of independence of the Dutch Low Countries.

Despite their growing linguistic and cultural unity, and (in the case of Flanders, Brabant and Holland) economic similarities, there was still little sense of political unity among the Dutch people.

However, the centralist policies of Burgundy in the 14th and 15th centuries, at first violently opposed by the cities of the Low Countries, had a profound impact and changed this. During Charles the Bold's many wars, which were a major economic burden for the Burgundian Netherlands, tensions slowly increased. In 1477, the year of Charles' sudden death at Nancy, the Low Countries rebelled against their new liege, Mary of Burgundy, and presented her with a set of demands.

The subsequently issued Great Privilege met many of these demands, which included that Dutch, not French, should be the administrative language in the Dutch-speaking provinces under Burgundian rule (i.e. Flanders, Brabant and Holland) and that the States-General had the right to hold meetings without the monarch's permission or presence. The overall tenor of the document (which was declared void by Mary's son and successor, Philip IV) aimed for more autonomy for the counties and duchies, but nevertheless all the fiefs presented their demands together, rather than separately. This is evidence that by this time a sense of common interest was emerging among the provinces of the Netherlands. The document itself clearly distinguishes between the Dutch speaking and French speaking provinces.

Following Mary's marriage to Maximilian I, Holy Roman Emperor, the Netherlands were now part of the Habsburg lands. Further centralised policies of the Habsburgs (like their Burgundian predecessors) again met with resistance, but, peaking with the formation of the collateral councils of 1531 and the Pragmatic Sanction of 1549 creating the Seventeen Provinces, were still implemented. The rule of Philip II of Spain sought even further centralist reforms, which, accompanied by religious dictates and excessive taxation, resulted in the Dutch Revolt. The Dutch provinces, though fighting alone now, for the first time in their history found themselves fighting a common enemy. This, together with the growing number of Dutch intelligentsia and the Dutch Golden Age in which Dutch culture, as a whole, gained international prestige, consolidated the Dutch as an ethnic group.

=== National identity ===
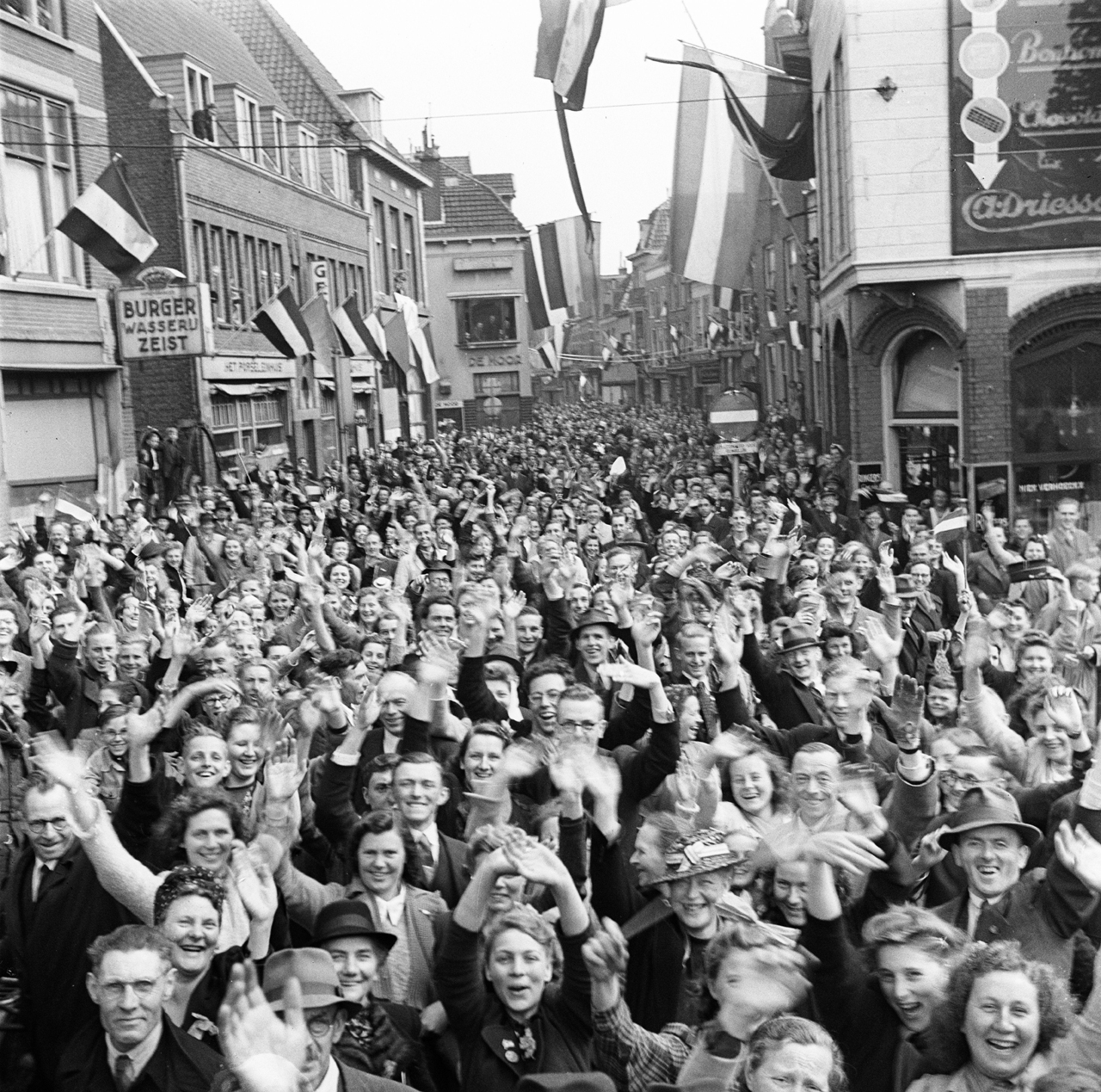
Dutch people celebrating the liberation of the Netherlands at the end of World War II on 7 May 1945

By the middle of the 16th century, an overarching, 'national' (rather than 'ethnic') identity seemed in development in the Habsburg Netherlands, when inhabitants began to refer to it as their 'fatherland' and were beginning to be seen as a collective entity abroad; however, the persistence of language barriers, traditional strife between towns, and provincial particularism continued to form an impediment to more thorough unification. Following excessive taxation together with attempts at diminishing the traditional autonomy of the cities and estates in the Low Countries, followed by the religious oppression after being transferred to Habsburg Spain, the Dutch revolted, in what would become the Eighty Years' War. For the first time in their history, the Dutch established their independence from foreign rule. However, during the war it became apparent that the goal of liberating all the provinces and cities that had signed the Union of Utrecht, which roughly corresponded to the Dutch-speaking part of the Spanish Netherlands, was unreachable. The Northern provinces were free, but during the 1580s the South was recaptured by Spain, and, despite various attempts, the armies of the Republic were unable to expel them. In 1648, the Peace of Münster, ending the Eighty Years' War, acknowledged the independence of the Dutch Republic, but maintained Spanish control of the Southern Netherlands. Apart from a brief reunification from 1815 until 1830, within the United Kingdom of the Netherlands (which included the Francophones/Walloons) the Dutch have been separated from the "Flemings" to this day. The border between the Netherlands and Belgium is purely contingent, simply reflecting the 1648 cease-fire line. There is a perfect dialect continuum.

=== Dutch Empire ===
The Dutch colonial empire (Dutch: Het Nederlandse Koloniale Rijk) comprised the overseas territories and trading posts controlled and administered by Dutch chartered companies (mainly the Dutch West India Company and the Dutch United East India Company) and subsequently by the Dutch Republic (1581–1795), and by the modern Kingdom of the Netherlands after 1815.

== Ethnic identity ==
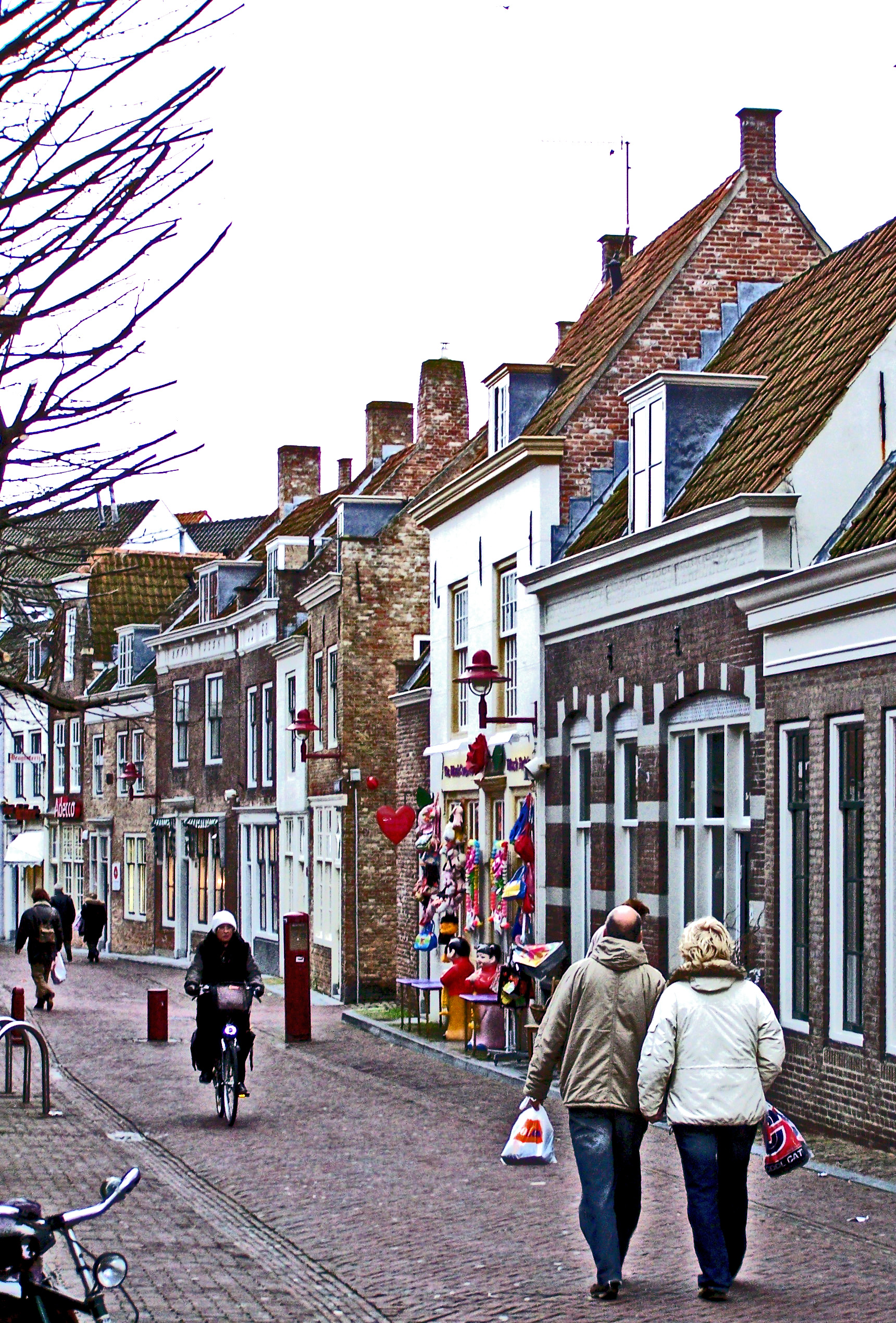
A typical November scene in the Dutch town Middelburg, Netherlands

=== Hollander vs. Nederlander ===
Many Dutch people (Nederlanders) will object to being called Hollanders as a national denominator on much the same grounds as many Welsh or Scots would object to being called English instead of British, as the Holland region only comprises two of the twelve provinces, and 40% of the Dutch citizens. The same holds for the country being referred to as Holland instead of The Netherlands.

=== (Multi)cultural identity ===
The ideologies associated with (Romantic) Nationalism of the 19th and 20th centuries never really caught on in the Netherlands. The (re)definition of Dutch cultural identity has become a subject of public debate following the increasing influence of the European Union and the influx of non-Western immigrants in the post-World War II period. In this debate typically Dutch traditions have been put to the foreground.

In sociological studies and governmental reports, ethnicity is often referred to with the terms autochtoon and allochtoon. These legal concepts refer to place of birth and citizenship rather than cultural background and do not coincide with the more fluid concepts of ethnicity used by cultural anthropologists.

=== Greater Netherlands ===
As did many European ethnicities during the 19th century, the Dutch also saw the emerging of various Greater Netherlands- and pan-movements seeking to unite the Dutch-speaking peoples across the continent, while trying to counteract Pan-Germanic tendencies. During the first half of the 20th century, there was a prolific surge in writings concerning the subject. One of its most active proponents was the historian Pieter Geyl, who wrote De Geschiedenis van de Nederlandsche stam ('The History of the Dutch tribe/people') as well as numerous essays on the subject.

During World War II, when both Belgium and the Netherlands fell to German occupation, fascist elements (such as the NSB and Verdinaso) tried to convince the Nazis into combining the Netherlands and Flanders. The Germans however refused to do so, as this conflicted with their ultimate goal, the Neuordnung ('New Order') of creating a single pan-Germanic racial state. During the entire Nazi occupation, the Germans denied any assistance to Greater Dutch ethnic nationalism, and, by decree of Hitler himself, actively opposed it.

The 1970s marked the beginning of formal cultural and linguistic cooperation between Belgium (Flanders) and the Netherlands on an international scale.

== Statistics ==
The total number of Dutch can be defined in roughly two ways. By taking the total of all people with full Dutch ancestry, according to the current CBS definition (both parents born in the Netherlands), resulting in an estimated 16,000,000 Dutch people, or by the sum of all people worldwide with both full and partial Dutch ancestry, which would result in a number around 33,000,000.

Approximate distribution of native Dutch speakers worldwide.
1. Netherlands (70.8%)
2. Belgium (27.1%)
3. Suriname (1.70%)
4. Caribbean (0.10%)
5. Other (0.30%)
People of (partial) Dutch ancestry outside the Netherlands.
1. (South) Africa (47.0%)
2. USA (20.0%)
3. Canada (7.00%)
4. France (6.00%)
5. Brazil (6.00%)
6. Indonesia (6.00%)
7. Australia (2.00%)
8. Germany (2.00%)
9. Belgium (1.00%)
10. Other (3.00%)

== Linguistics ==
=== Language ===
A Dutch speaker.

Dutch is the main language spoken by most Dutch people. It is a West Germanic language spoken by around 29 million people. Old Frankish, a precursor of the Dutch standard language, was first attested around 500, in a Frankish legal text, the Lex salica, and has a written record of more than 1500 years, although the material before around 1200 is fragmentary and discontinuous.

As a West Germanic language, Dutch is related to other languages in that group such as West Frisian, English and German. Many West Germanic dialects underwent a series of sound shifts. The Anglo-Frisian nasal spirant law and Anglo-Frisian brightening resulted in certain early Germanic languages evolving into what are now English and West Frisian, while the Second Germanic sound shift resulted in what would become (High) German. Dutch underwent none of these sound changes and thus occupies a central position in the West Germanic languages group.

Standard Dutch has a sound inventory of thirteen vowels, six diphthongs and twenty-three consonants, of which the voiceless velar fricative (hard ch) is considered a well known sound, perceived as typical for the language. Other relatively well known features of the Dutch language and usage are the frequent use of digraphs like Oo, Ee, Uu and Aa, the ability to form long compounds and the use of slang, including profanity.

The Dutch language has many dialects. These dialects are usually grouped into six main categories; Hollandic, West-Flemish/Zeelandic, East Flemish, Brabantic and Limburgish, although Limburgish is recognized as a regional language under part 2 of the European Charter for Regional or Minority Languages. The Dutch part of Low Saxon is sometimes also viewed as a dialect of Dutch as it falls in the area of the Dutch standard language, although it is recognized as a regional language. Of these dialects, Hollandic and Dutch Low Saxon are solely spoken by Northerners. Brabantic, East Flemish, West-Flemish/Zeelandic and Limburgish are cross border dialects in this respect. Lastly, the dialectal situation is characterised by the major distinction between 'Hard G' and 'Soft G' speaking areas (see also Dutch phonology). Some linguists subdivide these into approximately 28 distinct dialects.

Dutch immigrants also exported the Dutch language. Dutch was spoken by some settlers in the United States as a native language from the arrival of the first permanent Dutch settlers in 1615, surviving in isolated ethnic pockets until about 1900, when it ceased to be spoken except by first generation Dutch immigrants. The Dutch language nevertheless had a significant impact on the region around New York. For example, the first language of U.S. president Martin Van Buren was Dutch. Most of the Dutch immigrants of the 20th century quickly began to speak the language of their new country. For example, of the inhabitants of New Zealand, 0.7% say their home language is Dutch, despite the percentage of Dutch heritage being considerably higher.

Dutch is currently an official language of the Kingdom of the Netherlands (Netherlands, Aruba, Sint Maarten, and Curaçao), Belgium, Suriname, the European Union, and the Union of South American Nations (due to Suriname being a member). In South Africa and Namibia, Afrikaans is spoken, a daughter language of Dutch, which itself was an official language of South Africa until 1983. The Dutch, Flemish and Surinamese governments coordinate their language activities in the Nederlandse Taalunie ('Dutch Language Union'), an institution also responsible for governing the Dutch Standard language, for example in matters of orthography.

=== Etymology of autonym and exonym ===
The origins of the word Dutch go back to Proto-Germanic, the ancestor of all Germanic languages, *theudo (meaning "national/popular"); akin to Old Dutch dietsc, Old High German diutsch, Old English þeodisc and Gothic þiuda all meaning "(of) the common (Germanic) people". As the tribes among the Germanic peoples began to differentiate its meaning began to change. The Anglo-Saxons of England for example gradually stopped referring to themselves as þeodisc and instead started to use Englisc, after their tribe. On the continent *theudo evolved into two meanings: Diets or Duuts meaning "Dutch (people)" (archaic) and Deutsch (German, meaning "German (people)"). At first the English language used (the contemporary form of) Dutch to refer to any or all of the Germanic speakers on the European mainland (e.g. the Dutch, the Frisians and the Germans). Gradually its meaning shifted to the Germanic people they had most contact with, both because of their geographical proximity, but also because of the rivalry in trade and overseas territories: the people from the Republic of the Netherlands, the Dutch.

In the Dutch language, the Dutch refer to themselves as Nederlanders. Nederlanders derives from the Dutch word Neder, a cognate of English Nether both meaning "low", and "near the sea" (same meaning in both English and Dutch), a reference to the geographical texture of the Dutch homeland; the western portion of the North European Plain. Although not as old as Diets, the term Nederlands has been in continuous use since 1250.

=== Names ===
==== Tussenvoegsels ====
Dutch surnames (and surnames of Dutch origin) are generally easily recognisable. Many Dutch surnames feature a tussenvoegsel (lit. 'between-joiner'), which is a family name affix positioned between a person's given name and the main part of their family name. The most common tussenvoegsels are van (e.g. A. van Gogh "from/of"), de / der / den / te / ter / ten (e.g. A. de Vries, "the"), het / ’t (e.g. A. ’t Hart, "the"), and van de / van der / van den (e.g. A. van den Berg, "from/of the"). These affixes are not merged, nor capitalised by default. The second affix in a Dutch surname is never capitalised (e.g. Van den Berg). The first affix in a Dutch surname is only capitalised if it is not preceded by a first name, initial or other surname. For example Vincent van Gogh, V. van Gogh, mr. Van Gogh, Van Gogh and V. van Gogh-van den Berg are all correct, but Vincent Van Gogh is wrong. Many surnames of Dutch diaspora (mainly in the English-speaking world and Francophonie) are adapted, not only in pronunciation but also in spelling. For example, by merging and capitalising the affixes and main parts of the surnames (e.g. A. van der Bilt becomes A. Vanderbilt).

==== Spelling ====
Dutch names can differ greatly in spelling. The surname Baks, for example is also recorded as Backs, Bacxs, Bax, Bakx, Baxs, Bacx, Backx, Bakxs and Baxcs. Though written differently, pronunciation remains identical. Dialectal variety also commonly occurs, with De Smet and De Smit both meaning Smith for example.

==== Main types of surnames ====
There are several main types of surnames in Dutch:

- Patronymic surnames; the name is based on the personal name of the father of the bearer. Historically this has been by far the most dominant form. These types of names fluctuated in form as the surname was not constant. If a man called Willem Janssen (William, John's son) had a son named Jacob, he would be known as Jacob Willemsen (Jacob, Williams' son). Following civil registry, the form at time of registry became permanent. Hence today many Dutch people are named after ancestors living in the early 19th century when civil registry was introduced to the Low Countries. These names rarely feature tussenvoegsels. Similar to English names like Johnson.
- Toponymic surnames; the name is based on the location on which the bearer lives or lived. In Dutch this form of surname nearly always includes one or several tussenvoegsels, mainly van, van de and variants where van is translated as from. Many emigrants removed the spacing and capitalised these words, leading to derived names for well-known people like Cornelius Vanderbilt. Van translated as of (Dutch language does not distinguish between "of" and "from" both indicated by "van"), Dutch surnames can sometimes refer to upper class or aristocratic titles (e.g. William, Prince of Orange). However, in Dutch van mostly reflects the place of origin of the family and not any aristocratic claim to a holding (Van der Bilt – one who comes from De Bilt).
- Occupational surnames; the name is based on the occupation of the bearer. Well known examples include Molenaar, Visser and Smit. This practice is similar to English surnames (the example names translate perfectly to Miller, Fisher and Smith).
- Cognominal surnames; based on nicknames relating to physical appearance or other features, on the appearance or character of the bearer (at least at the time of registration). For example De Lange ('the tall one'), De Groot ('the big one'), De Dappere ('the brave').
- Other surnames may relate to animals. For example; De Leeuw ('The Lion'), Vogels ('Birds'), Koekkoek ('Cuckoo') and Devalck ('The Falcon'); to a desired social status; e.g., Prins ('Prince'), De Koninck/Koning ('King'), De Keyzer/Keizer ('Emperor'); or to colour; e.g. Rood ('red'), Blauw/Blaauw ('blue'), De Wit ('the white'). There is also a set of made up or descriptive names; e.g. Naaktgeboren ('born naked').

== Culture ==
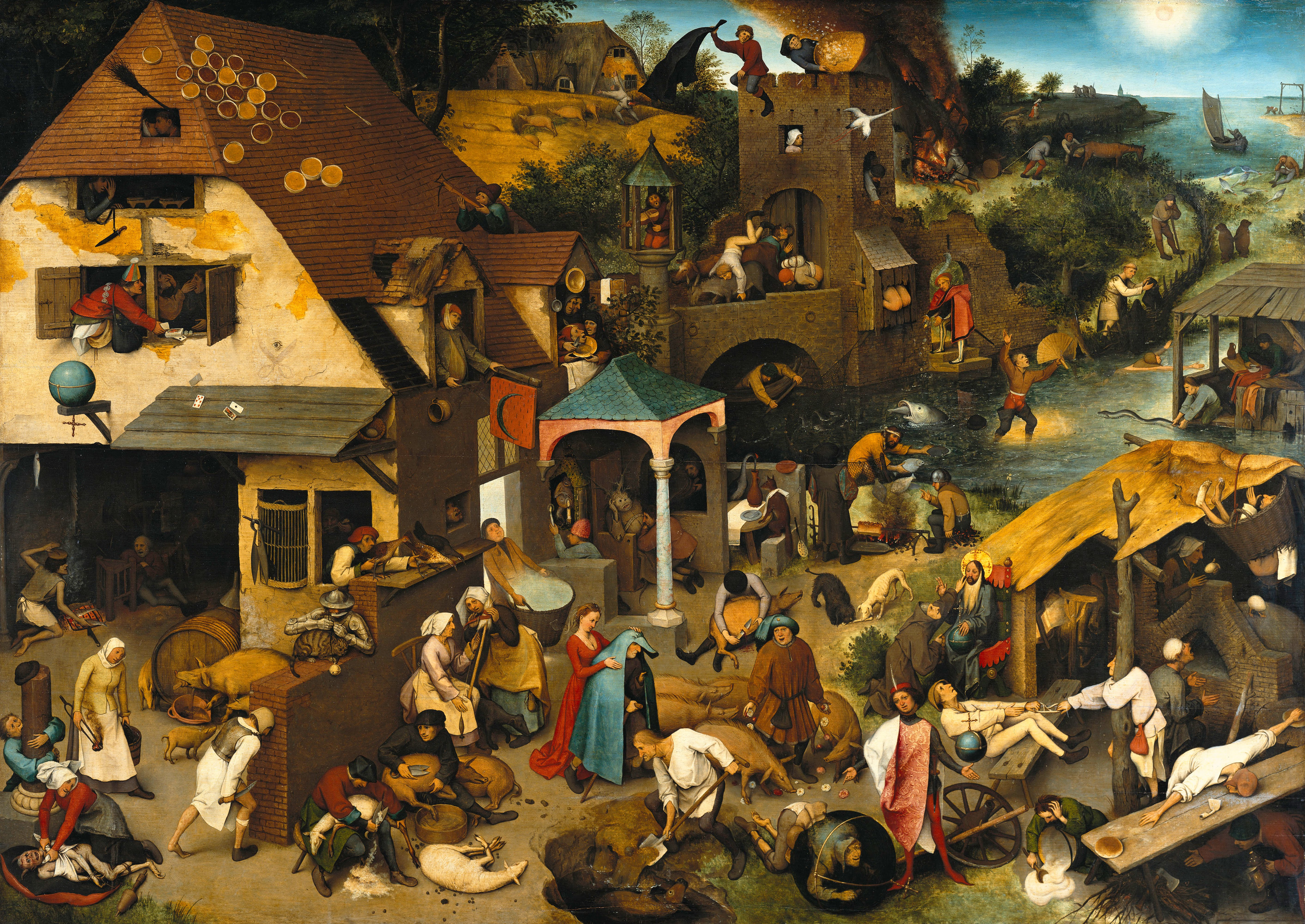
The Dutch Proverbs, Bruegel the Elder

=== Religion ===
Prior to the arrival of Christianity, the ancestors of the Dutch adhered to a form of Germanic paganism augmented with various Celtic elements. At the start of the 6th century, the first (Hiberno-Scottish) missionaries arrived. They were later replaced by Anglo-Saxon missionaries, who eventually succeeded in converting most of the inhabitants by the 8th century. Since then, Christianity has been the dominant religion in the region.

In the early 16th century, the Protestant Reformation began to form and soon spread in the Westhoek and the County of Flanders, where secret open-air sermons were held, called hagenpreken ('hedgerow orations') in Dutch. The ruler of the Dutch regions, Philip II of Spain, felt it was his duty to fight Protestantism and, after the wave of iconoclasm, sent troops to crush the rebellion and make the Low Countries a Catholic region once more. The Protestants in the southern Low Countries fled North en masse. Most of the Dutch Protestants were now concentrated in the free Dutch provinces north of the river Rhine, while the Catholic Dutch were situated in the Spanish-occupied or -dominated South. After the Peace of Westphalia in 1648, Protestantism did not spread South, resulting in a difference in religious situations.

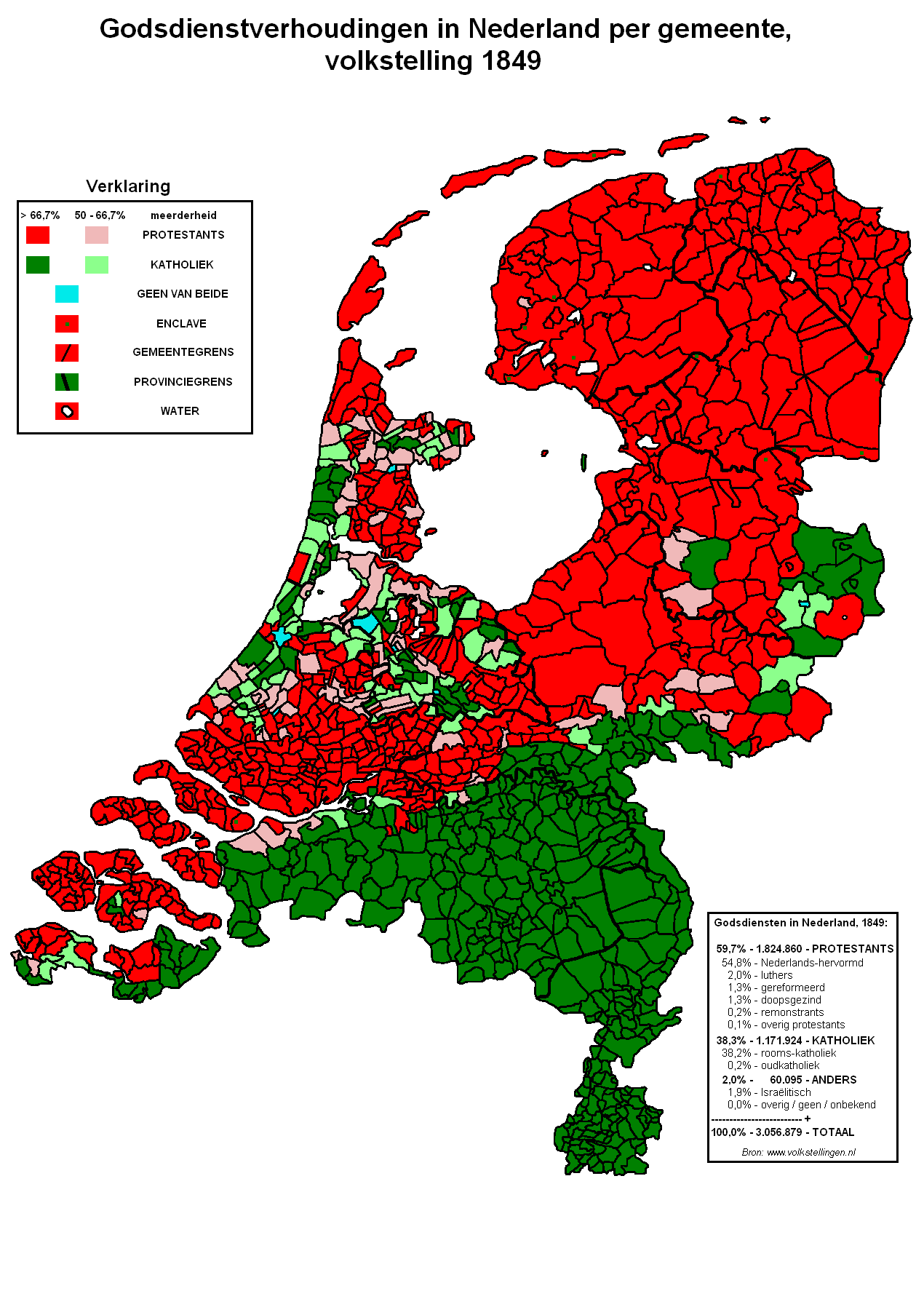
Religion in the Netherlands in 1849. Roman Catholicism Protestantism (Calvinist)

Contemporary Dutch, according to a 2017 study conducted by Statistics Netherlands, are mostly irreligious with 51% of the population professing no religion. The largest Christian denomination with 24% are the Roman Catholics, followed by 15% Protestants. Furthermore, there are 5% Muslims and 6% others (among others Buddhists). People of Dutch ancestry in the United States, Canada, and South Africa are generally more religious than their European counterparts; for example, the numerous Dutch communities of western Michigan remain strongholds of the Reformed Church in America and the Christian Reformed Church, both descendants of the Dutch Reformed Church.

=== Cultural divergences ===
One cultural division within Dutch culture is that between the formerly Protestant North and the nowadays Catholic South, which encompasses various cultural differences between the Northern Dutch on one side and the Southern Dutch on the other. This subject has historically received attention from historians, notably Pieter Geyl (1887–1966) and Carel Gerretson (1884–1958). The historical pluriformity of the Dutch cultural landscape has given rise to several theories aimed at both identifying and explaining cultural divergences between different regions. One theory, proposed by A.J. Wichers in 1965, sees differences in mentality between the southeastern, or 'higher', and northwestern, or 'lower' regions within the Netherlands, and seeks to explain these by referring to the different degrees to which these areas were feudalised during the Middle Ages. Another, more recent cultural divide is that between the Randstad, the urban agglomeration in the West of the country, and the other provinces of the Netherlands.

The grote rivieren ("Great Rivers") of the Netherlands mark the cultural division between north and south

In Dutch, the cultural division between North and South is also referred to by the colloquialism "below/above the great rivers" as the rivers Rhine and Meuse roughly form a natural boundary between the Northern Dutch (those Dutch living North of these rivers), and the Southern Dutch (those living South of them). The division is partially caused by (traditional) religious differences, with the North used to be predominantly Protestant and the South still having a majority of Catholics. Linguistic (dialectal) differences (positioned along the Rhine/Meuse rivers) and to a lesser extent, historical economic development of both regions are also important elements in any dissimilarity.

On a smaller scale cultural pluriformity can also be found; be it in local architecture or (perceived) character. This wide array of regional identities positioned within such a relatively small area, has often been attributed to the fact that many of the current Dutch provinces were de facto independent states for much of their history, as well as the importance of local Dutch dialects (which often largely correspond with the provinces themselves) to the people who speak them.

==== Northern Dutch culture ====
Northern Dutch cultural area.

Northern Dutch culture is marked by Protestantism, especially Calvinism. Though today many do not adhere to Protestantism anymore, or are only nominally part of a congregation, Protestant-(influenced) values and customs are present. Generally, it can be said that the Northern Dutch are more pragmatic, favor a direct approach, and display a less-exuberant lifestyle when compared to Southerners. On a global scale, the Northern Dutch have formed the dominant vanguard of the Dutch language and culture since the fall of Antwerp, exemplified by the use of "Dutch" itself as the demonym for the country in which they form a majority; the Netherlands. Linguistically, Northerners speak any of the Hollandic, Zeelandic, and Dutch Low Saxon dialects natively, or are influenced by them when they speak the Standard form of Dutch. Economically and culturally, the traditional centre of the region have been the provinces of North and South Holland, or today; the Randstad, although for a brief period during the 13th or 14th century it lay more towards the east, when various eastern towns and cities aligned themselves with the emerging Hanseatic League. The entire Northern Dutch cultural area is located in the Netherlands, its ethnically Dutch population is estimated to be just under 10,000,000. (Note: Estimate based on the population of the Netherlands, without the southern provinces and non-ethnic Dutch.) Northern Dutch culture has been less under French influence than the Southern Dutch culture area.

===== Frisians =====
Frisians, specifically West Frisians, are an ethnic group present in the north of the Netherlands, mainly concentrated in the province of Friesland. Culturally, modern Frisians and the (Northern) Dutch are rather similar; the main and generally most important difference being that Frisians speak West Frisian, one of the three sub-branches of the Frisian languages, alongside Dutch, and they find this to be a defining part of their identity as Frisians.

According to a 1970 inquiry, West Frisians identified themselves more with the Dutch than with East Frisians or North Frisians. A study in 1984 found that 39% of the inhabitants of Friesland considered themselves "primarily Frisian," although without precluding also being Dutch. A further 36 per cent claimed they were Dutch, but also Frisian, the remaining 25% saw themselves as only Dutch. A 2013 study showed that 45% of the population of Friesland saw themselves as "primarily Frisian", again without precluding the possibility of also identifying as Dutch. Frisians are not disambiguated from the Dutch people in Dutch official statistics.

In the Netherlands itself "West-Frisian" refers to a Hollandic region of the province of North-Holland known as West-Friesland, which was conquered by the counts of Holland in 1297. The surviving dialect, West Frisian, with a Frisian substrate, remains used and "West-Frisians" refers to its speakers.

==== Southern Dutch culture ====
Southern Dutch cultural area.

The Southern Dutch sphere generally consists of the areas in which the population was traditionally Catholic. During the early Middle Ages up until the Dutch Revolt, the Southern regions were more powerful, as well as more culturally and economically developed. At the end of the Dutch Revolt, it became clear the Habsburgs were unable to reconquer the North, while the North's military was too weak to conquer the South, which, under the influence of the Counter-Reformation, had started to develop a political and cultural identity of its own. The Southern Dutch, including Dutch Brabant and Limburg, remained Catholic or returned to Catholicism. The Dutch dialects spoken by this group are Brabantic, Kleverlandish, Limburgish and East and West Flemish. In the Netherlands, an oft-used adage used for indicating this cultural boundary is the phrase boven/onder de rivieren (Dutch: above/below the rivers), in which 'the rivers' refer to the Rhine and the Meuse. Southern Dutch culture has been influenced more by French culture, as opposed to the Northern Dutch culture area.

===== Flemings =====
Within the field of ethnography, it is argued that the Dutch-speaking populations of the Netherlands and Belgium have a number of common characteristics, with a mostly shared language, some generally similar or identical customs, and with no clearly separate ancestral origin or origin myth.

However, the popular perception of being a single group varies greatly, depending on subject matter, locality, and personal background. Generally, the Flemish will seldom identify themselves as being Dutch and vice versa, especially on a national level. This is partly caused by the popular stereotypes in the Netherlands as well as Flanders, which are mostly based on the "cultural extremes" of both Northern and Southern culture, including in religious identity. Though these stereotypes tend to ignore the transitional area formed by the Southern provinces of the Netherlands and most Northern reaches of Belgium, resulting in overgeneralisations.

In the case of Belgium, there is the added influence of nationalism as the Dutch language and culture were oppressed by the francophone government. This was followed by a nationalist backlash during the late 19th and early 20th centuries that saw little help from the Dutch government (which for a long time following the Belgian Revolution had a reticent and contentious relationship with the newly formed Belgium and a largely indifferent attitude towards its Dutch-speaking inhabitants) and, hence, focused on pitting "Flemish" culture against French culture, resulting in the forming of the Flemish nation within Belgium, a consciousness of which can be very marked among some Dutch-speaking Belgians.

== Genetics ==
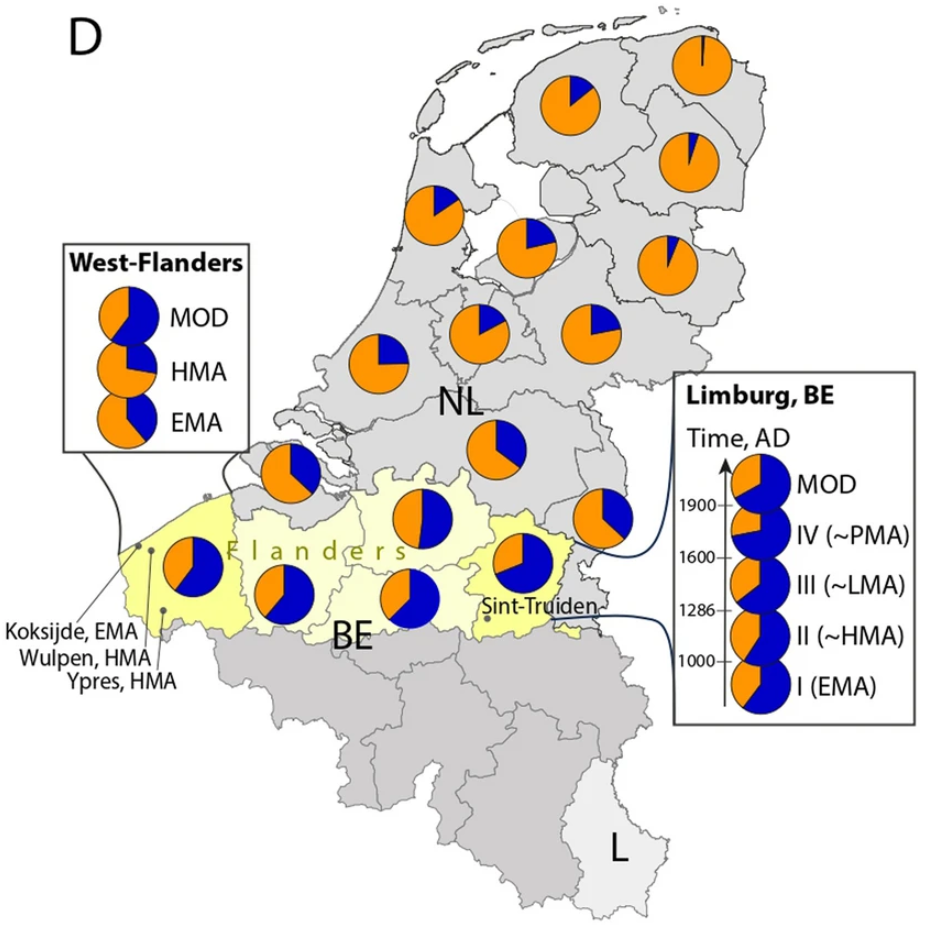
Map showing average Gaulish (blue) and Germanic (orange) ancestry proportions by the provinces of the Netherlands and Flanders of Belgium.

The largest patterns of human genetic variation within the Netherlands show strong correlations with geography and distinguish between: (1) North and South; (2) East and West; and (3) the middle-band and the rest of the country. The distribution of gene variants for eye colour, metabolism, body height and immune system show differences between these regions that reflect evolutionary selection pressures.

The largest genetic differences within the Netherlands are observed between the North and the South (with the three major rivers – Rijn, Waal, Maas – as a border), with the Randstad showing a mixture of these two ancestral backgrounds. The European North-South cline correlates highly with this Dutch North-South cline and shows several other similarities, such as a correlation with height (with the North being taller on average), blue/brown eye colour (with the North having more blue eyes), and genome-wide homozygosity (with the North having lower homozygosity levels). The correlation with genome-wide homozygosity likely reflects the serial founder effect that was initiated with the ancient successive out-of-Africa migrations. This does not necessarily mean that these events (north-ward migration and evolutionary selection pressures) took place within the borders of the Netherlands; it could also be that Southern Europeans have migrated more to the South of the Netherlands, and/or Northern Europeans more to the Northern parts.

The north–south differences were likely maintained by the relatively strong segregation of the Catholic South and the Protestant North during the last centuries. During the last 50 years or so there was a large increase of non-religious individuals in the Netherlands. Their spouses are more likely to come from a different genetic background than those of religious individuals, causing non-religious individuals to show lower levels of genome-wide homozygosity than Catholics or Protestants.

== Height ==
The Dutch are the tallest people in the world, by nationality, with an average height of 1.81 metres (5 ft 11.3 in) for men and 1.67 metres (5 ft 5.7 in) for women in 2009. The average height of young men in the Netherlands increased from 5 feet, 4 inches to approximately 6 feet between the 1850s until the early 2000s.

The rapid increase in height is attributed partly to natural selection and partly to environmental factors. Natural or sexual selection appears to play a role, with taller men having more children. The role of evolution is disputed, however.

In the 21st century, average height in the Netherlands has started to decrease. This trend is partly due to immigration, but is also present in "people without a migration background".

== Dutch diaspora ==
Distribution of the Dutch and their descendants around the world. Netherlands + 1,000,000 + 100,000 + 10,000 + 1,000

Since World War II, Dutch emigrants have mainly departed the Netherlands for Canada, the Federal Republic of Germany, the United States, Belgium, Australia, and South Africa, in that order. Today, large Dutch communities also exist in the United Kingdom, France, Spain, Turkey, and New Zealand.

=== Central and Eastern Europe ===
During the German eastward expansion (mainly taking place between the 10th and 13th century), a number of Dutchmen moved as well. They settled mainly east of the Elbe and Saale rivers, regions largely inhabited by Polabian Slavs. After the capture of territory along the Elbe and Havel Rivers in the 1160s, Dutch settlers from flooded regions in Holland used their expertise to build dikes in Brandenburg, but also settled in and around major German cities such as Bremen and Hamburg and German regions of Mecklenburg and Brandenburg. From the 13th to the 15th centuries, the Teutonic Order invited several waves of Dutch and Frisians to settle throughout Prussia, mainly along the Baltic Sea coast. The first place in modern Poland where Dutch immigrants settled was Pasłęk in 1297, once renamed Holąd after the settlers.

In the early-to-mid-16th century, Dutch Mennonites began to move from the Low Countries (especially Friesland and Flanders) to the Vistula delta region, seeking religious freedom and exemption from military service. The territories which they settled were located in the regions of Pomerelia and Powiśle in northern Poland, and later also in Masovia in central Poland. These communities became known as the Olęders, a Polish rendering of the term Hollander. After the partitions of Poland, the Prussian authorities took over and its government eliminated exemption from military service on religious grounds.

The Dutch Mennonites also migrated as far as the Russian Empire, where they were offered land along the Volga River. Some settlers left for Siberia in search for fertile land. The Russian capital itself, Moscow, also had a number of Dutch immigrants, mostly working as craftsmen. Arguably the most famous of which was Anna Mons, the mistress of Peter the Great.

Historically Dutch also lived directly on the eastern side of the German border, most have since been assimilated (apart from ~40,000 recent border migrants), especially since the establishment of Germany itself in 1872. Cultural marks can still be found though. In some villages and towns a Dutch Reformed church is present, and a number of border districts (such as Cleves, Borken and Viersen) have towns and village with an etymologically Dutch origin. In the area around Cleves (German Kleve, Dutch Kleef) traditional dialect is Dutch, rather than surrounding (High/ Low) German. More to the South, cities historically housing many Dutch traders have retained Dutch exonyms for example Aachen (Aken) and Cologne/Köln (Keulen) to this day.

=== Southern Africa ===
Traditional Cape Dutch architecture (Swellendam)

Although Portuguese explorers made contact with the Cape of Good Hope as early as 1488, much of present-day South Africa was ignored by Europeans until the Dutch East India Company (VOC) established its first outpost at Cape Town, in 1652. Dutch colonisers began arriving shortly thereafter, making the Cape home to the oldest Western-based civilisation south of the Sahara. Some of the earliest mulatto communities in the country were subsequently formed through unions between colonists, enslaved people, and various Khoikhoi tribes. This led to the development of a major South African ethnic group, Cape Coloureds, who adopted the Dutch language and culture. As the number of Europeans—particularly women—in the Cape swelled, South African whites closed ranks as a community to protect their privileged status, eventually marginalising Coloureds as a separate and inferior racial group.

Since VOC employees proved inept farmers, tracts of land were granted to married Dutch citizens who undertook to spend at least twenty years in South Africa. Upon the revocation of the Edict of Nantes in 1685, they were joined by French Huguenots fleeing religious persecution at home, who interspersed among the original freemen. Between 1685 and 1707 the company also extended free passage to any Dutch families wishing to resettle at the Cape. At the beginning of the eighteenth century there were roughly 600 people of Dutch birth or descent residing in South Africa, and around the end of Dutch rule in 1806 the number had reached 13,360.

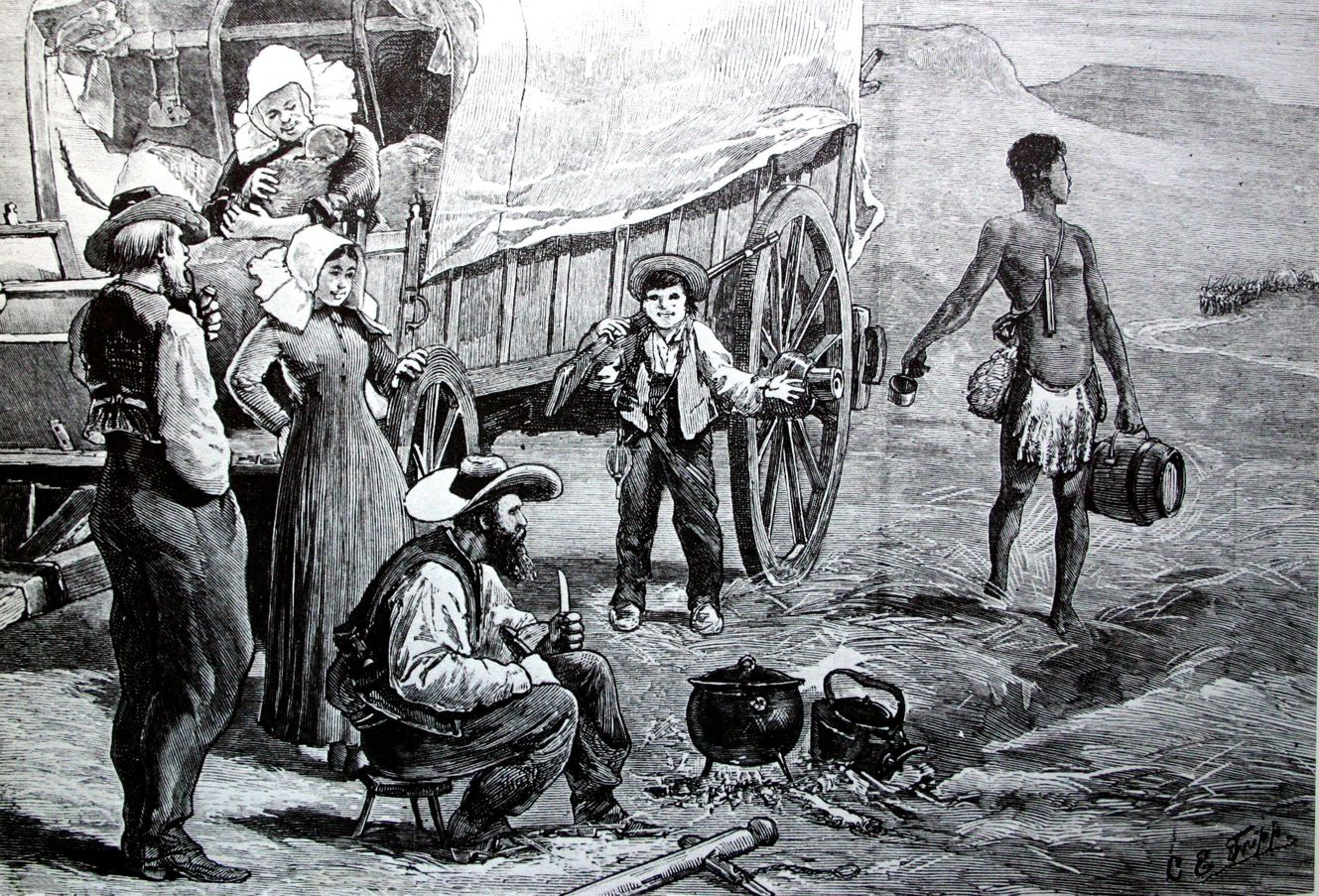
Boer Voortrekkers in South Africa

Some vrijburgers eventually turned to cattle ranching as trekboers, creating their own distinct sub-culture centered around a semi-nomadic lifestyle and isolated patriarchal communities. By the eighteenth century there had emerged a new people in Africa who identified as Afrikaners, rather than Dutchmen, after the land they had colonised.

Afrikaners are dominated by two main groups, the Cape Dutch and Boers, which are partly defined by different traditions of society, law, and historical economic bases. Although their language (Afrikaans) and religion remain undeniably linked to that of the Netherlands, Afrikaner culture has been strongly shaped by three centuries in South Africa. Afrikaans, which developed from Early Modern Dutch, has been influenced by English, Malay-Portuguese creole, and various African languages. Dutch was taught to South African students as late as 1914 and a few upper-class Afrikaners used it in polite society, but the first Afrikaans literature had already appeared in 1861. The Union of South Africa granted Dutch official status upon its inception, but in 1925 Parliament openly recognised Afrikaans as a separate language. It differs from Standard Dutch by several pronunciations borrowed from Malay, German, or English, the loss of case and gender distinctions, and in the extreme simplification of grammar. The dialects are no longer considered quite mutually intelligible.

During the 1950s, Dutch immigration to South Africa began to increase exponentially for the first time in over a hundred years. The country registered a net gain of around 45,000 Dutch immigrants between 1950 and 2001, making it the sixth most popular destination for citizens of the Netherlands living abroad.

=== Southeast Asia ===
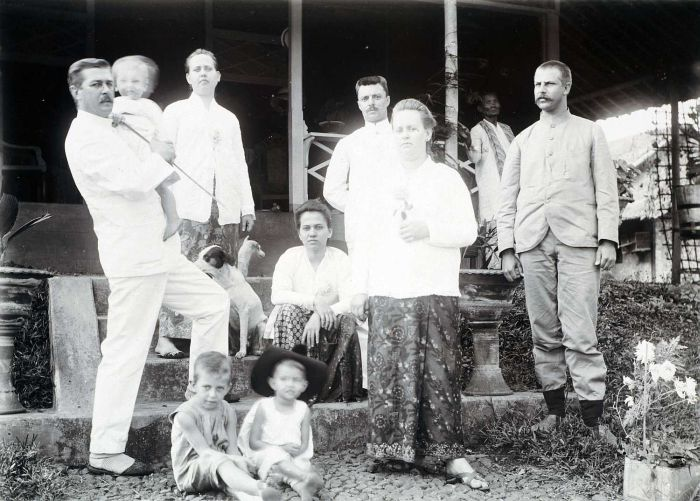
Dutch family in Java c. 1903

Since the 16th century, there has been a Dutch presence in Southeast Asia, Taiwan, and Japan. In many cases, the Dutch were the first Europeans whom the people living there encountered. Between 1602 and 1796, the VOC sent almost a million Europeans to work in its territories in Asia. The majority died of disease or made their way back to Europe, but some of them made the Indies their new home. Interaction between the Dutch and the indigenous populations mainly took place in Sri Lanka and the modern Indonesian Islands. Most of the time, Dutch soldiers married local women and settled in the colonies. Through the centuries, there developed a relatively large Dutch-speaking population of mixed Dutch and Indonesian descent, known as Indos or Dutch-Indonesians. The expulsion of Dutchmen following the Indonesian Revolt means that currently the majority of this group lives in the Netherlands. Statistics show that Indos are the largest minority group in the Netherlands and number close to half a million (excluding the third generation).

=== West Africa ===
Though many Ghanaians of European origin are of British origin, there are a small number of Dutch people in Ghana. The forts in Ghana have a small number of Dutch people. Most of the Dutch population is in Accra, where the Netherlands has its embassy.

=== Australia and New Zealand ===
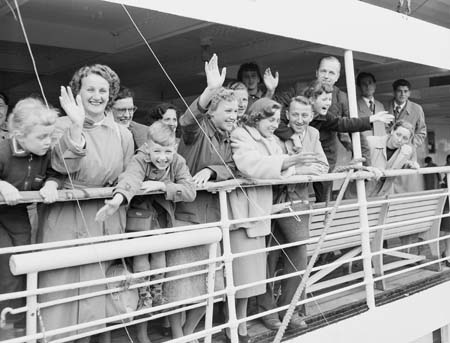
Dutch migrants arriving in Australia in 1954

Though the Dutch were the first Europeans to visit Australia and New Zealand, colonisation did not take place and it was only after World War II that a sharp increase in Dutch emigration to Australia occurred. Poor economic prospects for many Dutchmen as well as increasing demographic pressures, in the post-war Netherlands were a powerful incentive to emigrate. Due to Australia experiencing a shortage of agricultural and metal industry workers it, and to a lesser extent New Zealand, seemed an attractive possibility, with the Dutch government actively promoting emigration.

The effects of Dutch migration to Australia can still be felt. There are many Dutch associations and a Dutch-language newspaper continues to be published. The Dutch have remained a tightly knit community, especially in the large cities. In total, about 382,000 people of Dutch ancestry live in Australia whereas New Zealand has some 100,000 Dutch descendants.

=== North America ===
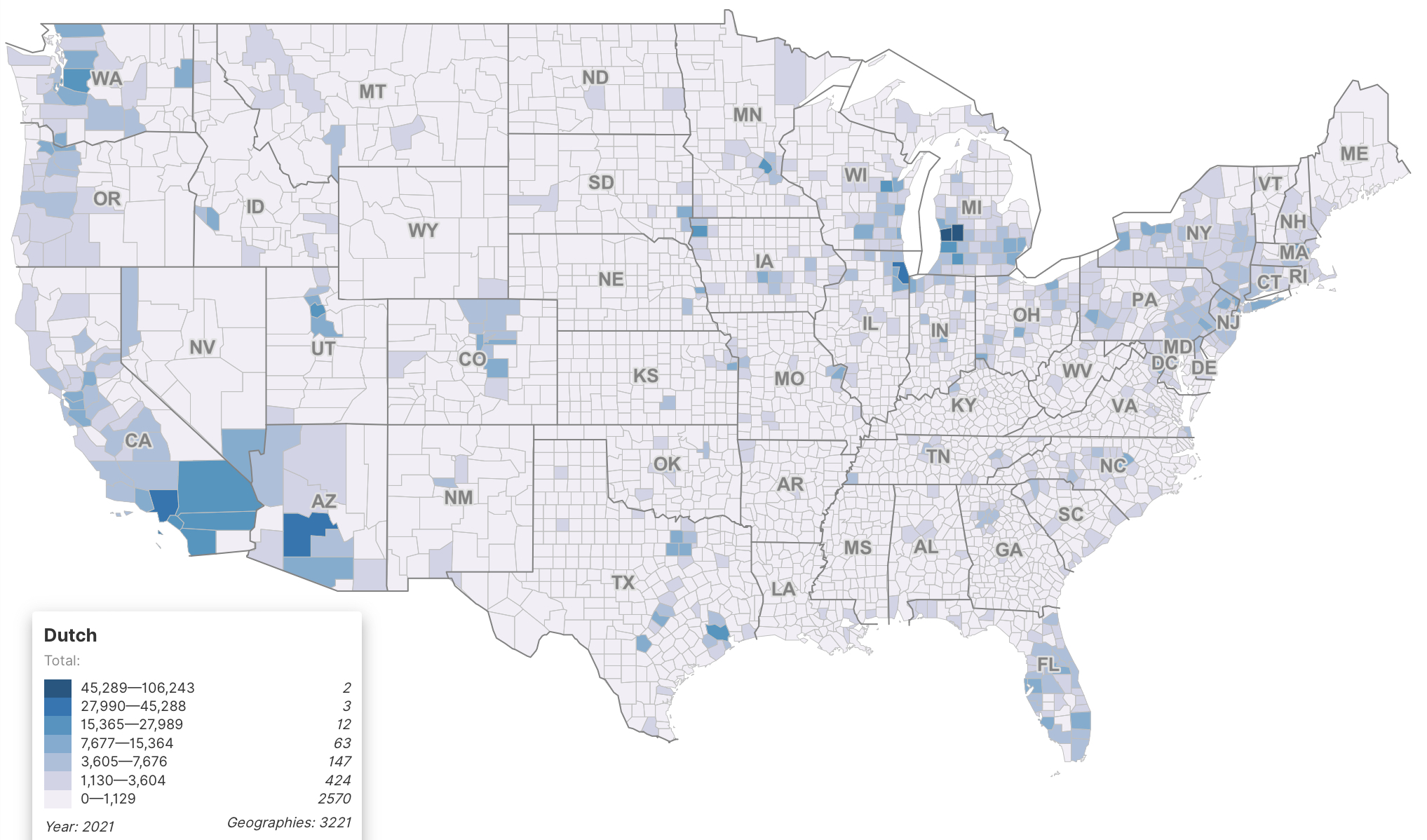
Population of Dutch Americans per U.S. county according to the 2020 U.S. census

The Dutch had settled in North America long before the establishment of the United States of America. For a long time the Dutch lived in Dutch colonies (New Netherland settlements), owned and regulated by the Dutch Republic, which later became part of the Thirteen Colonies.

Nevertheless, many Dutch American communities remained virtually isolated towards the rest of North America up until the American Civil War, in which the Dutch fought for the North and adopted many American ways.

Most future waves of Dutch immigrants were quickly assimilated. There have been five U.S. presidents of Dutch descent: Martin Van Buren (8th, first president who was not of British descent, first language was Dutch), Franklin D. Roosevelt (32nd, elected to four terms in office, he served from 1933 to 1945, the only U.S. president to have served more than two terms), Theodore Roosevelt (26th), as well as George H. W. Bush (41st) and George W. Bush (43rd), the latter two descendant from the Schuyler family.

The first Dutch people to come to Canada were Dutch Americans among the United Empire Loyalists. The largest wave was in the late 19th and early 20th centuries, when large numbers of Dutch helped settle the Canadian west. During this period significant numbers also settled in major cities like Toronto.

While interrupted by World War I, this migration returned in the 1920s, but again halted during the Great Depression and World War II. After the war a large number of Dutch immigrants moved to Canada, including a number of war brides of the Canadian soldiers who liberated the Netherlands. There were officially 1,886 Dutch war brides emigrating to Canada, ranking second after British war brides. During the war Canada had sheltered Crown Princess Juliana and her family. Due to these close links during and after the war, Canada became a popular destination for Dutch immigrants.

=== Caribbean ===
Most Dutch settlement in the Caribbean occurred on the Dutch Caribbean islands of Aruba, Bonaire, Curaçao and to a lesser extent Sint Maarten, Saba and Sint Eustatius.

Both the Leeward (Alonso de Ojeda, 1499) and Windward (Christopher Columbus, 1493) island groups were discovered and initially settled by the Spanish. In the 17th century, the islands were conquered by the Dutch West India Company after the defeat of Spain to the Netherlands in Eighty Years' War, with the largest island Curaçao being used as a regional slave trading hub and free port.

Dutch settlement was relatively limited in the Caribbean during the colonial era, although there are sizable minorities of Dutch people on the Dutch Caribbean islands in modern times. There are also significant populations of partial Dutch or mixed-race descent on the islands, on Aruba mixed-race people make up the majority of the population with many having significant Dutch heritage.

=== South America ===
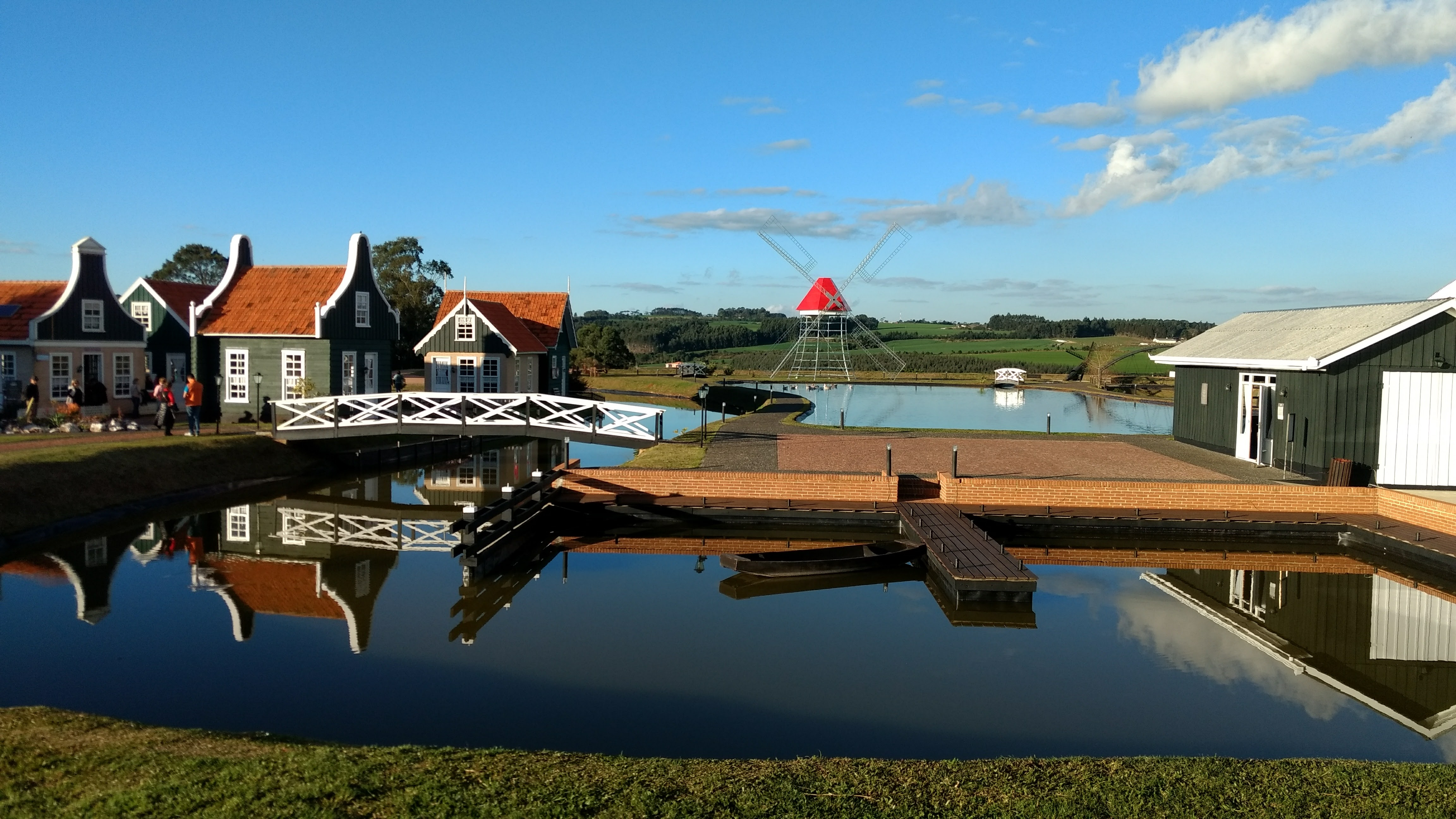
View of the Carambeí Historical Park in Carambeí, Paraná, Brazil. Mill and houses in Dutch architecture on the left

In South America, the Dutch settled mainly in Brazil, Argentina and Suriname.

The Dutch were among the first Europeans settling in Brazil during the 17th century. They controlled the northern coast of Brazil from 1630 to 1654 (Dutch Brazil). A significant number of Dutch immigrants arrived in that period. The state of Pernambuco (then Captaincy of Pernambuco) was once a colony of the Dutch Republic from 1630 to 1661. There are a considerable number of people who are descendants of the Dutch colonists in Paraíba (for example in Frederikstad, today João Pessoa), Pernambuco, Alagoas and Rio Grande do Norte. During the 19th and 20th century, Dutch immigrants from the Netherlands immigrated to the Brazil's Center-South, where they founded a few cities. The majority of Dutch Brazilians reside in the states of Espírito Santo, Paraná, Rio Grande do Sul, Pernambuco and São Paulo. There are also small groups of Dutch Brazilians in Goiás, Ceará, Rio Grande do Norte, Mato Grosso do Sul, Minas Gerais and Rio de Janeiro.

In Argentina, Dutch immigration has been one of many migration flows from Europe in the country, although it has not been as numerous as in other cases (they failed to account for 1% of total migration received). However, Argentina received a large contingent of Dutch since 1825. The largest community is in the city of Tres Arroyos in the south of the province of Buenos Aires.

In Suriname, the Dutch migrant settlers in search of a better life started arriving in the 19th century with the boeroes, poor farmers arriving from the Dutch provinces of Gelderland, Utrecht, and Groningen. Furthermore, the Surinamese ethnic group, the Creoles, persons of mixed African-European ancestry, are partially of Dutch descent. Many Dutch settlers left Suriname after independence in 1975, which diminished the white Dutch population in the country. Currently there are around 1000 Boeroes left in Suriname, and 3000 outside Suriname. Inside Suriname, they work in several sectors of society and some families still work in the agricultural sector.

== See also ==
- Afrikaner
- Dutch Brazil
- Dutch Chilean
- Dutch Mexicans
- Dutch customs and etiquette
- Dutch Surinamese
- Flemish people
- List of Dutch people
- List of Germanic peoples
- Netherlands (terminology)
- Netherlands Antilles
- New Netherlands
- Dutch American
- Dutch cuisine
- Dutch culture
