= Public holidays in the Netherlands =

The national holidays in the Netherlands are the following:

Date	English name	Dutch name	Notes
1 January	New Year's Day	Nieuwjaarsdag	
March or April	Good Friday	Goede Vrijdag	This is a national holiday, but not a mandatory paid holiday and a normal workday for most employees. It is a popular day off due to the Easter weekend, especially the combination with Easter Monday.
March or April	Easter	Pasen	The Netherlands have a two-day holiday, called Eerste Paasdag on Sunday and Tweede Paasdag on Monday (lit. 'First Easter Day' and 'Second Easter Day' respectively)
27 April	King's Day	Koningsdag	If 27 April falls on a Sunday, King's Day is celebrated on the 26th.
5 May	Liberation Day	Bevrijdingsdag	This is a national holiday, but not a mandatory paid holiday for everyone. It is customary for many employers to grant a paid holiday every five years on this day.
Forty days after Easter	Ascension Day	Hemelvaartsdag	The subsequent Friday is a popular day off for many people, though it is not a paid holiday.
Seven weeks after Easter	Pentecost	Pinksteren	A two-day holiday (Sunday and the subsequent Monday), called Eerste Pinkstersdag and Tweede Pinksterdag (lit. 'First Pentecost Day' and 'Second Pentecost Day' respectively)
25–26 December	Christmas Day	Kerstmis	Like Easter and Pentecost, the Netherlands celebrate two days of Christmas, called Eerste Kerstdag and Tweede Kerstdag (lit. 'First Christmas Day' and 'Second Christmas Day' respectively)

While there are other holidays which are widely celebrated, these are not officially recognised national holidays. They are as follows:

- Saint Nicholas's Eve (the eve of Sinterklaas, also called Sinterklaasavond or Pakjesavond) on 5 December is not a national holiday, it is widely celebrated. Saint Nicholas' traditional name day is on 6 December; however, it is Saint Nicholas' Eve, the day before, which is the focus of celebrations in the Netherlands.
- In the south and east of the Netherlands, Carnival is celebrated on the three days before Ash Wednesday. The earliest possible date is on 1 February, the latest possible date is 9 March. Though not an official holiday, many people, particularly in the south, take the week off to celebrate. Schools in both regions schedule their spring holiday at the same time.
- There has been some debate over whether the Islamic holiday of Eid ul-Fitr (Dutch: Suikerfeest; lit. 'Sugar festival') should be a national holiday. This was met by opposition from right-wing political parties such as the PVV and SGP. For now, Eid ul-Fitr is not an official national holiday, but it usually justifies a day off for Islamic employees. Schools are still able to give additional days off for this purpose.

== See also ==
- Dutch festivities
- Public holidays in Belgium
- Public holidays in France
