= Grote rivieren =

Dutch river delta and cultural boundary

Map of the grote rivieren (highlighted in red) which are understood to be the Nederrijn ("Lower Rhine"), Lek, Waal, Merwede and Maas ("Meuse") rivers

The grote rivieren, literally translated from Dutch into Great (or Large) Rivers, is a landform in the Netherlands with several major continental rivers that flow west into the North Sea. The term is also commonly used for a divide in Dutch culture between north and south, linking to the broader Dutch-Flemish culture.

== History ==
The grote rivieren have throughout history been a dividing line across the Netherlands. At many points in time the rivers formed a boundary between states or empires. Notable examples include the northern border of the Roman Empire in the Roman province of Germania Inferior, and the border between the Dutch Republic and Spanish and later Austrian Netherlands at various points in their contentious history. The latter of these historical examples also played a large role in the religious divide the rivers straddle. In more recent times, part of the rivers were also challenging for Allies in their operations against Germany in the Netherlands.

== Geography ==
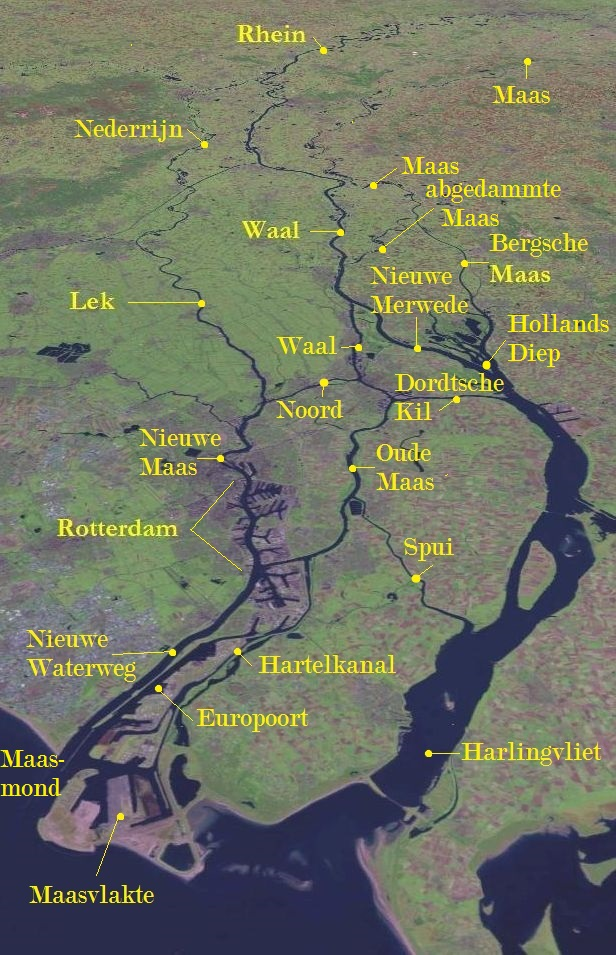
The Rhine-Meuse delta and the rivers that flow into it form the Grote rivieren

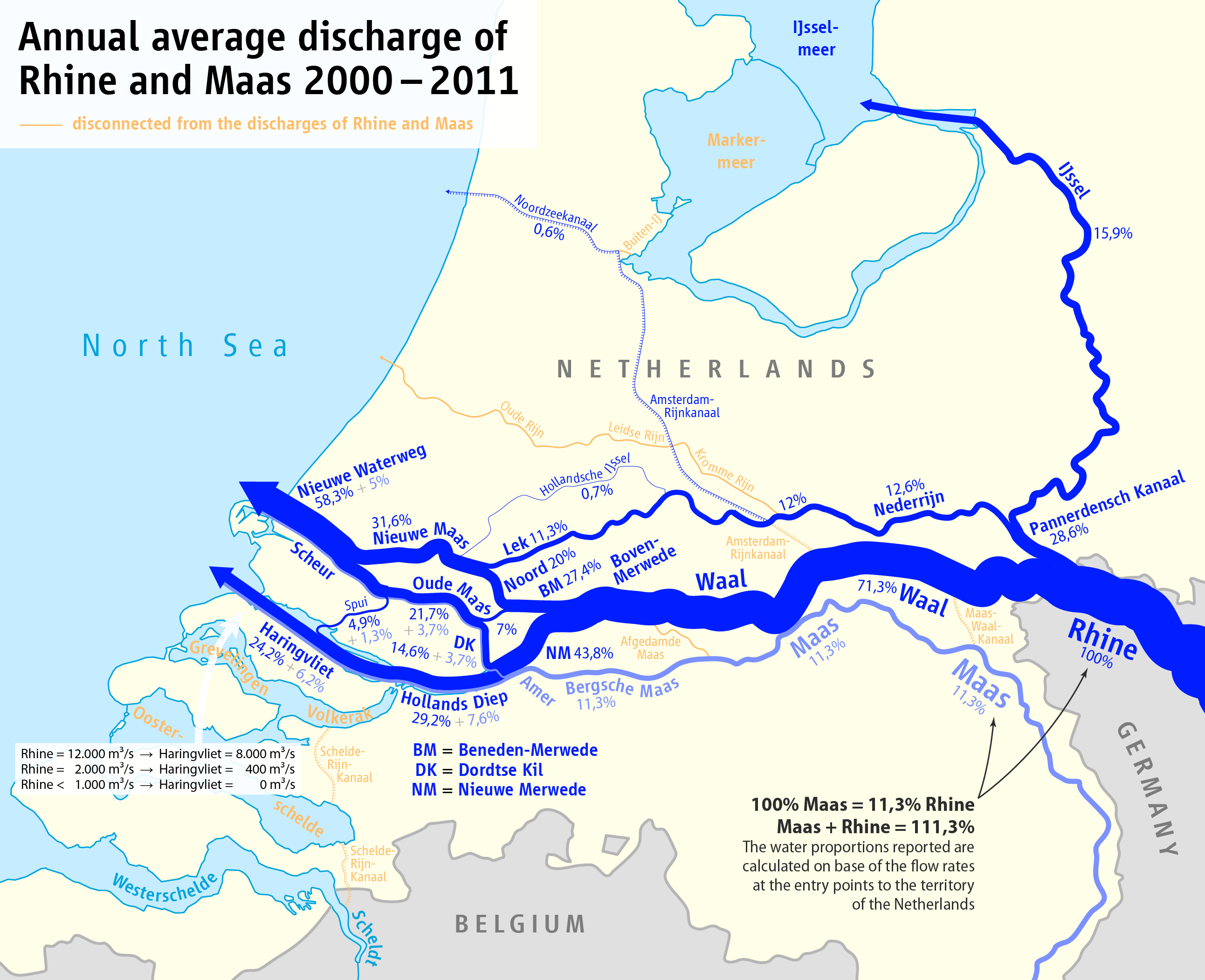
Map of river discharge in the Netherlands; the majority flows through the grote rivieren

The term grote rivieren refers to the division of the Netherlands by the Nederrijn, Lek, Waal, Merwede and Meuse rivers, which dominate an area roughly 150 km in length from west to east and 25 km wide from north to south. The rivers form part of the Rhine-Meuse-Scheldt delta which discharges into the North Sea. The rivers are the primary distributaries of the Rhine and Meuse rivers, flowing from the Swiss Alps and the Langres plateau respectively.

The grote rivieren flow through the provinces of Gelderland, North Brabant, Utrecht and South Holland. Many settlements are within the delta, such as the city of Nijmegen.

== Economy ==
The grote rivieren are entirely navigable and serve important roles in the transport of goods in the region, as well as to areas higher upstream, such as the heavily industrialised Rhine-Ruhr area in Germany. In the Netherlands, the Port of Rotterdam, Europe's largest port, is heavily dependent on the navigability of the rivers to transport goods into the hinterland.

To aid in the transport of goods through the grote rivieren, many canals have been dug to improve connectivity with nearby cities, most notably the Amsterdam-Rhine Canal, which links up the grote rivieren with the cities of Utrecht and Amsterdam, including the Port of Amsterdam.

== Sociocultural meaning ==
By use of the Dutch colloquialism boven/onder de grote rivieren ("above/below the great rivers"), the boundary created by the rivers is highlighted in a cultural sense. The major divergence here is the difference between the predominantly Protestant north and the predominantly Catholic southern provinces of North Brabant and Limburg. When the term is used in that sense, Zeeland (the islands in the south-west), being mostly Protestant, is often considered above, although it does have a mainly Catholic part in Zeelandic Flanders.

Various cultural differences are associated with this border, including dialectical differences (such as the use of the so-called Hard G in the north and the soft G in the south) and sociological ones (with northerners being considered more direct, austere, and goal oriented and southerners more indirect, easy-going, and status oriented).

Within the Netherlands, the cultural distinction is often considered more important than any cultural differences between the Netherlands as a whole and the Dutch-speaking part of Belgium, also called Flanders. The cultural differences play a part in daily life within the Dutch-speaking region and are factors in personal identification among its inhabitants.
