= Dutch festivities =

Occasions celebrated by the Dutch

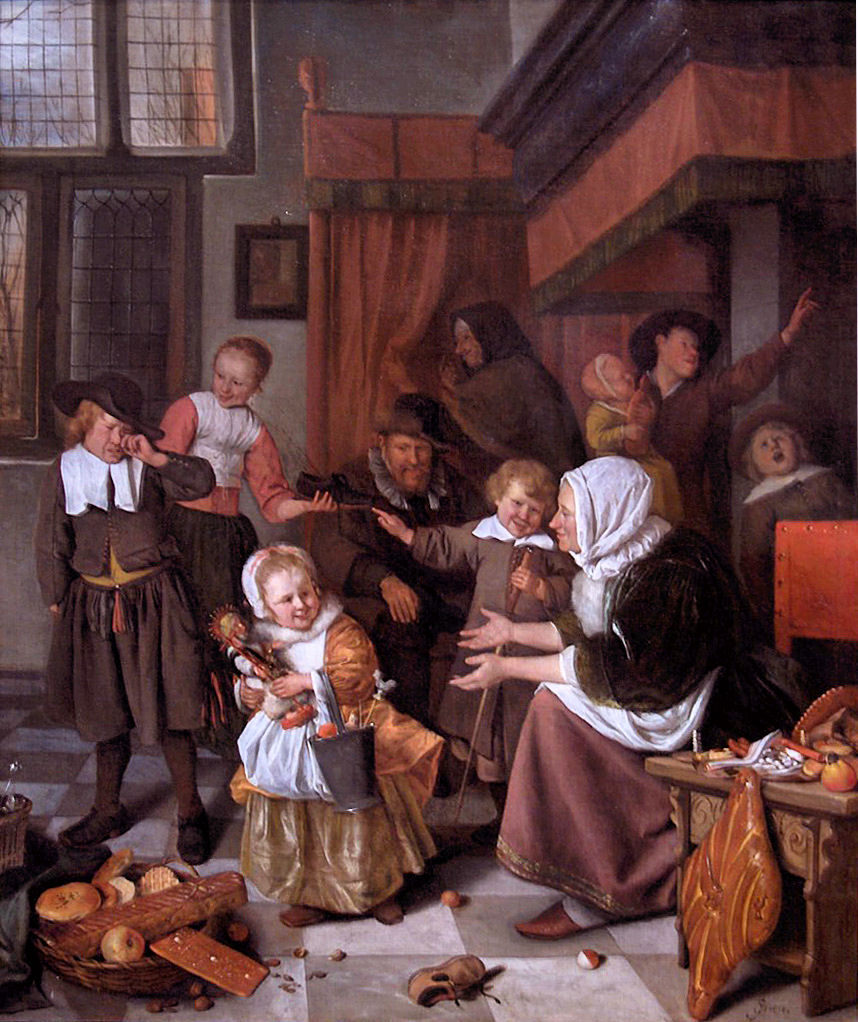
The Feast of Saint Nicholas, painted c. 1665 – 1668, by Jan Steen.

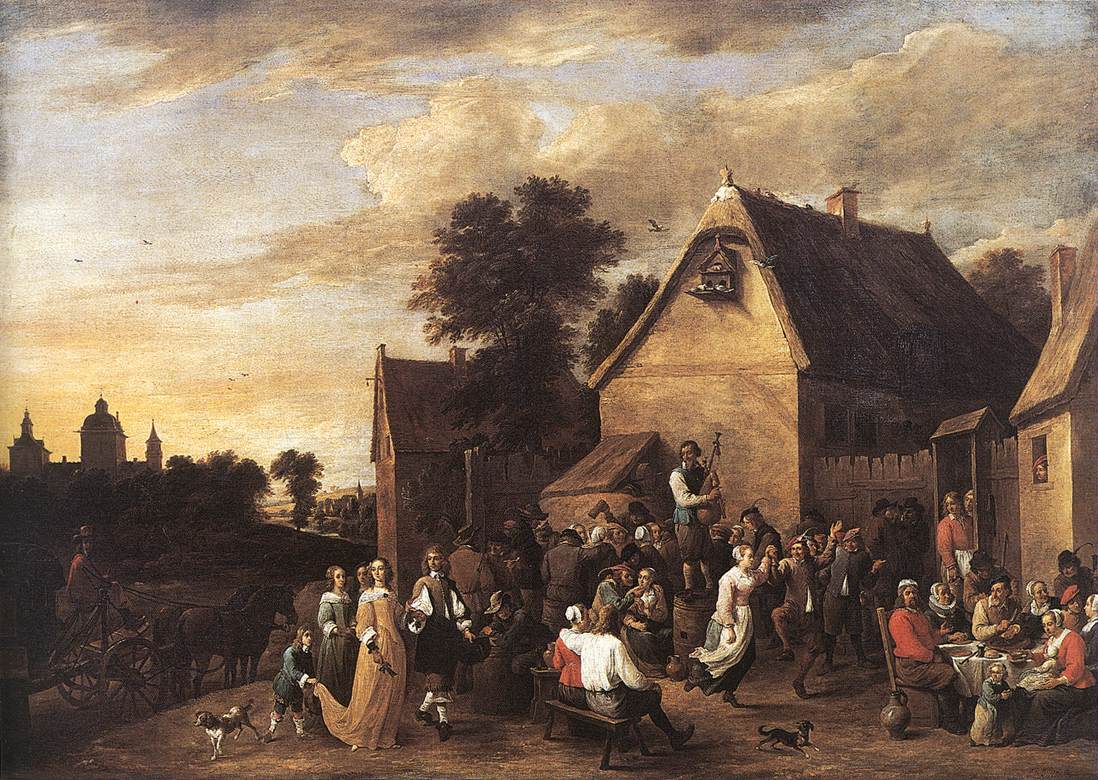
Flemish Kermess by David Teniers the Younger (1652)

Dutch festivities are associated with the Dutch ethnic group. National holidays (such as King's Day) are omitted.

== Events ==
Major festivities include:

=== Feast of St. Nicholas ===
The Feast of Saint Nicholas celebrates the name day of Saint Nicholas, patron saint of, among others, children, who are the feast's principal focus. They receive presents, candy and poems. Nicholas originated from Germanic mythology, with the Dutch figure of Sinterklaas representing the god Odin. Both have a beard, hat and spear (later a staff) and the cloth bag held by servants to capture naughty children. Both Saint Nicolas and Odin ride flying white horses. Letters made of chocolate given by the Zwarte Pieten to children evokes the fact that Odin 'invented' the rune letters. Poems and songs relate to Odin as the god of poetry. It is celebrated on December 5 or 6.

=== Christmas ===
Christmas lasts two days and is a time of togetherness. Gifts are generally not exchanged. Usually celebrations are with one's direct, and not extended, family. It's celebrated on December 25 and 26.

=== New Year's Eve ===
New Year's Eve is called Old Year's Day in Dutch, and is celebrated with friends, family, and fireworks. On this day, traditional New Year's pastries such as Oliebollen are eaten. Following these activities it is customary to express a good intention for the next year. The following morning is marked by visits to family. It is celebrated on December 31.

=== Kermesse ===
Kermesse originally denoted the mass said on the anniversary of the foundation of a church (or the parish), and in honor of the patron. It came to mark the celebrations of such an anniversary. Many towns and larger villages hold their own Kermesse once each year. It mixes feasting, dancing, sports and funfair attractions.

=== Birthdays ===
Birthdays are called Year days in Dutch, are greeted with enthusiasm. Family and friends often visit, call or send a card. It is considered anti-social to ignore one's own birthday. Instead of people showering the birthday person with special treats, the celebrant treats those around him or her. This is exemplified by the custom to bring pastries to work or treats for classmates. Dutch people generally keep a Birthday calendar, often in their bathroom.

== See also ==
- Dutch people
- Public holidays in the Netherlands
