= 't Hart =

't Hart is a Dutch surname. Dutch het hart means "the heart", but in the past also "the deer" as well as "the village green". People with this name include:

- Henk 't Hart (1944–2000), Dutch botanist
- Kees 't Hart (born 1944), Dutch writer, poet and literary critic
- Lenie 't Hart (born 1941), Dutch animal caretaker and animal rights activist
- Maarten 't Hart (born 1944), Dutch writer and biologist
