= Royal Castle, Warsaw =

Castle in Warsaw, Poland

Royal Castle
- Zamek Królewski
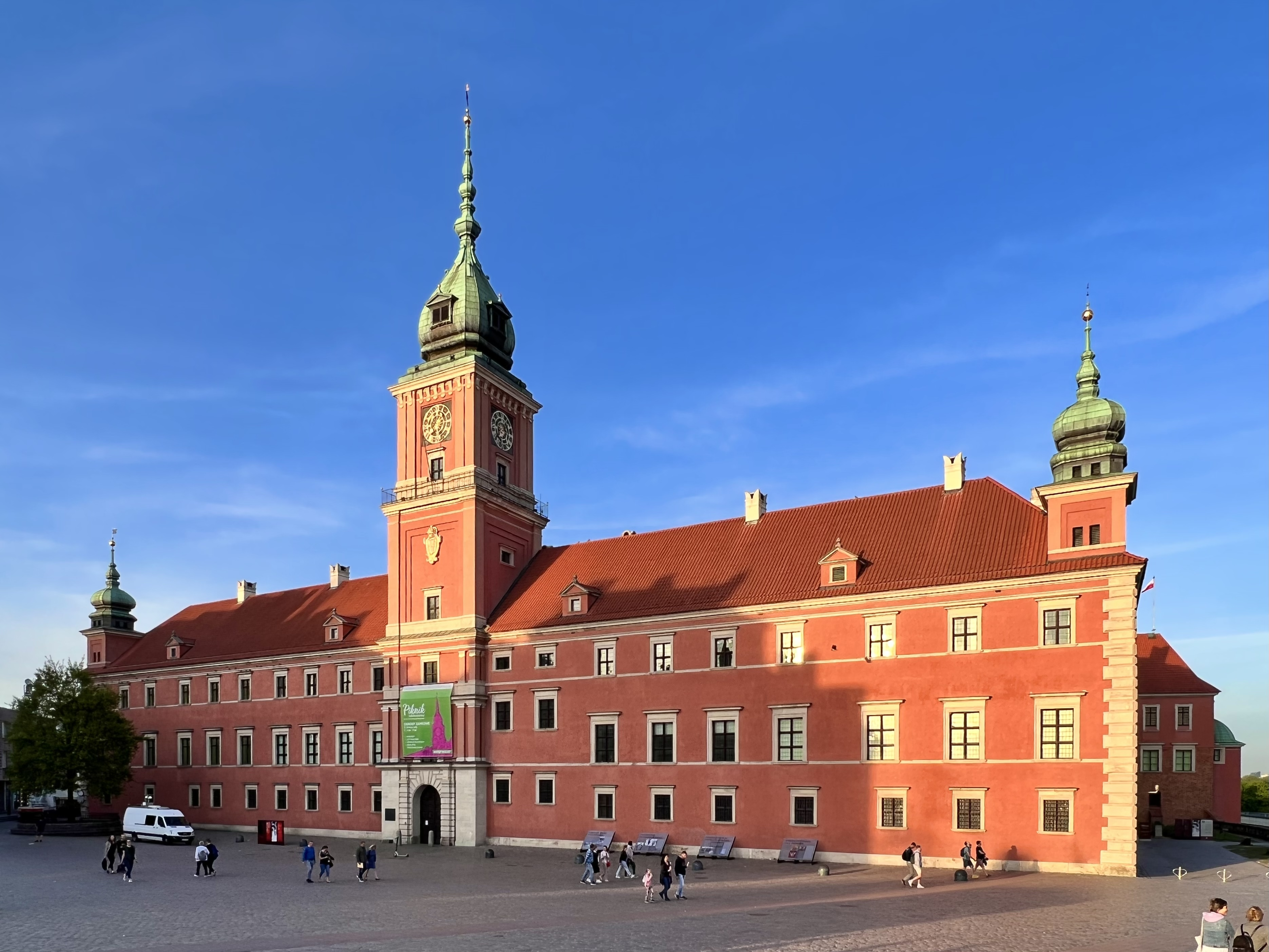
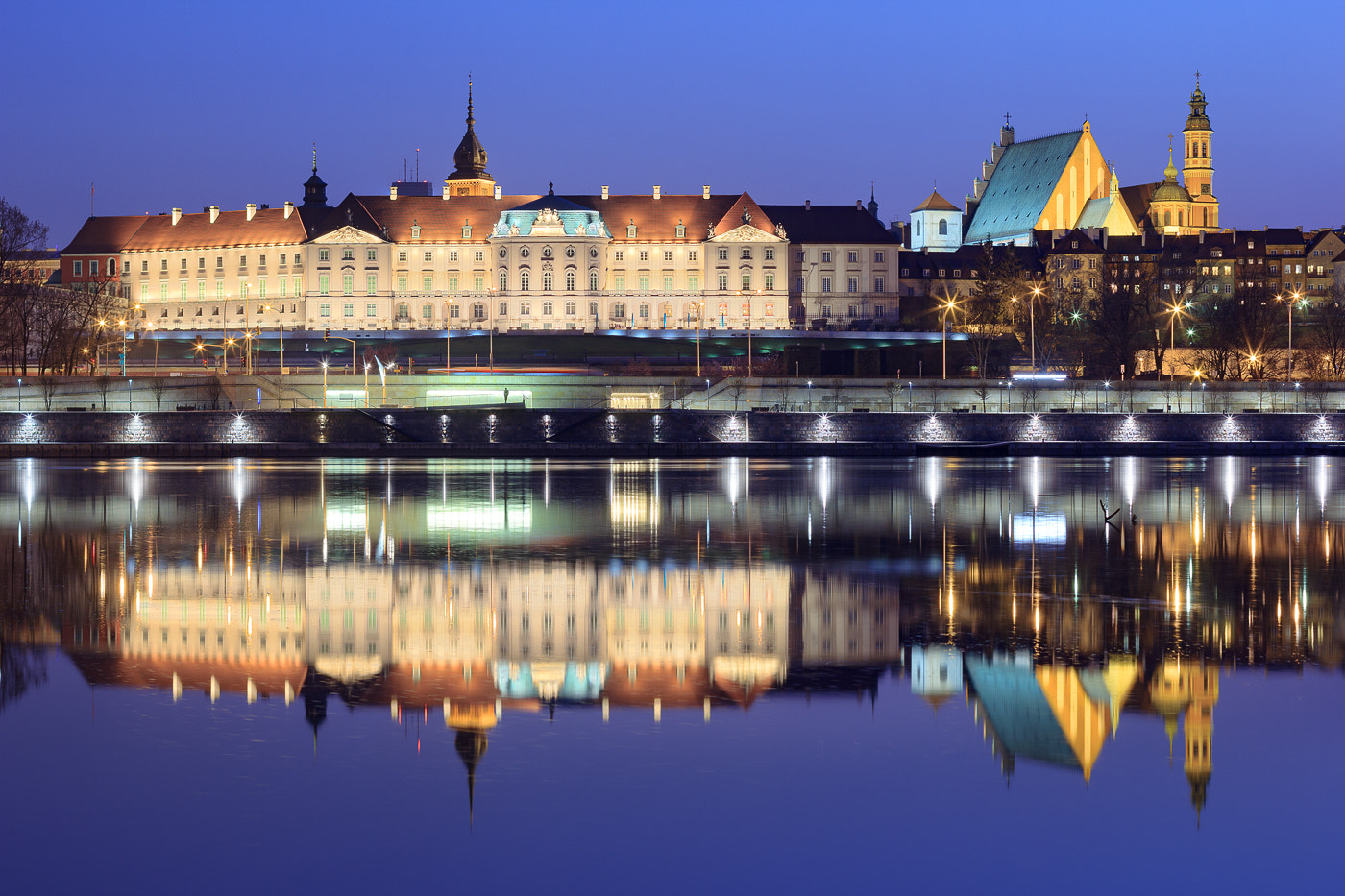
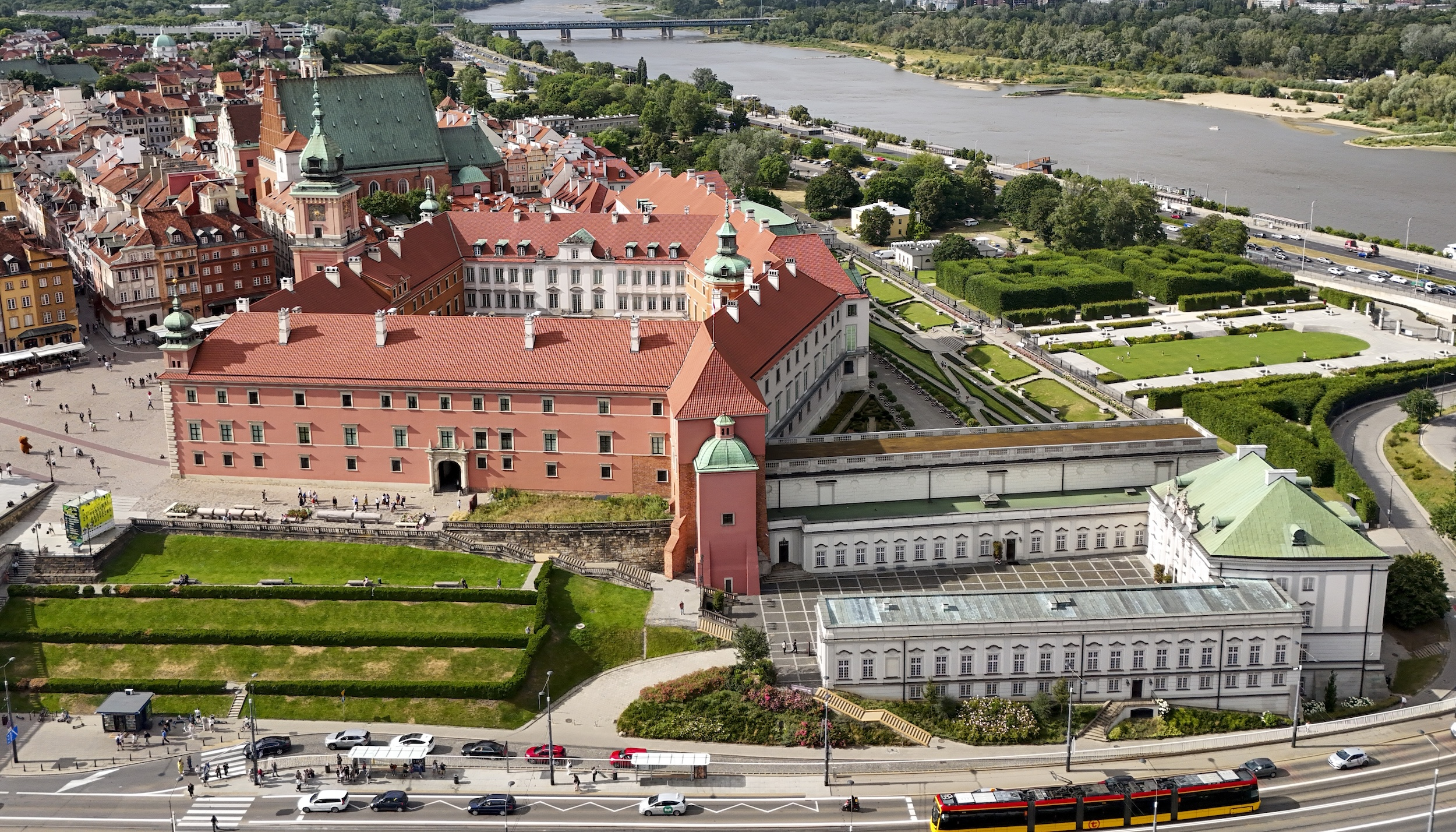
- View from Castle Square (top), from the Vistula River (middle), and an aerial view of the southern facade (bottom)
- Interactive fullscreen map

General information
- Type: Castle residency
- Architectural style: Mannerist-Baroque
- Location: Poland
- Coordinates: 52°14′52″N 21°00′51″E
- Construction started: 1598 (original); 1971 (reconstruction)
- Completed: 1619 (original); 1984 (reconstruction)
- Demolished: 10 – 13 September 1944 (German Army)
- Client: Sigismund III Vasa

Height
- Height: 60 metres

Design and construction
- Architects: Matteo Castelli, Giovanni Battista Trevano, Gaetano Chiaveri

Website
- www.zamek-krolewski.pl/en

UNESCO World Heritage Site
- Type: Cultural
- Criteria: ii, vi
- Part of: Historic Centre of Warsaw
- Reference no.: 30bis
- UNESCO region: Europe

Historic Monument of Poland
- Designated: 1994-09-08
- Part of: Warsaw – historic city center with the Royal Route and Wilanów
- Reference no.: M.P. 1994 nr 50 poz. 423

The Royal Castle in Warsaw (Polish: Zamek Królewski w Warszawie [ˈzamɛk kruˈlɛfskʲi v varˈʂavjɛ]) is a former royal residence and seat of government in Warsaw, Poland. Located on Castle Square, at the entrance to the Old Town, it now houses a state museum with collections of Polish and European art. The castle is part of the Historic Centre of Warsaw, a UNESCO World Heritage Site.

The castle originated in the 14th century as a residence of the Dukes of Masovia. Following the incorporation of Masovia into the Kingdom of Poland in 1526, it became a royal residence. From the late 16th century, it served as one of the principal seats of the monarchs and parliament of the Polish–Lithuanian Commonwealth. Substantially enlarged under Sigismund III Vasa in the early 17th century, it acquired its characteristic Mannerist-Baroque appearance. Its interiors were extensively remodelled in the 18th century, particularly under Stanisław August Poniatowski, the last king of Poland. The castle was the site of major political events, most notably the adoption of the Constitution of 3 May 1791 by the Great Sejm. During the Second Polish Republic (1918–1939), it served as a residence of the Polish head of state and, from 1926, as the official residence of the President of Poland.

The castle was severely damaged during the siege of Warsaw in September 1939 and was subsequently looted by the German occupation authorities. In September 1944, during the Warsaw Uprising, the surviving structure was deliberately demolished by German forces. Following a decision taken in 1971, the castle was reconstructed using surviving architectural fragments, historical documentation and works of art rescued during the war. The reconstructed interiors were opened to the public in 1984, although restoration of the wider castle complex continued into the 21st century.

== History ==
=== Overview ===
The history of the castle dates back to the 14th century when the first Castle Tower was constructed, and the fortified complex was initially used as the residence of the Masovian dukes. In the early 1600s, it was designated to replace Wawel Castle in Kraków as the seat of the king, Parliament (Chamber of Deputies and Senate), and the Polish–Lithuanian Commonwealth. The medieval Gothic structure was remodeled into Italian mannerism by architects Matteo Castelli and Giovanni Battista Trevano. The Baroque easternmost wing was designed by Gaetano Chiaveri and completed in 1747.

=== Castle in the Middle Ages ===
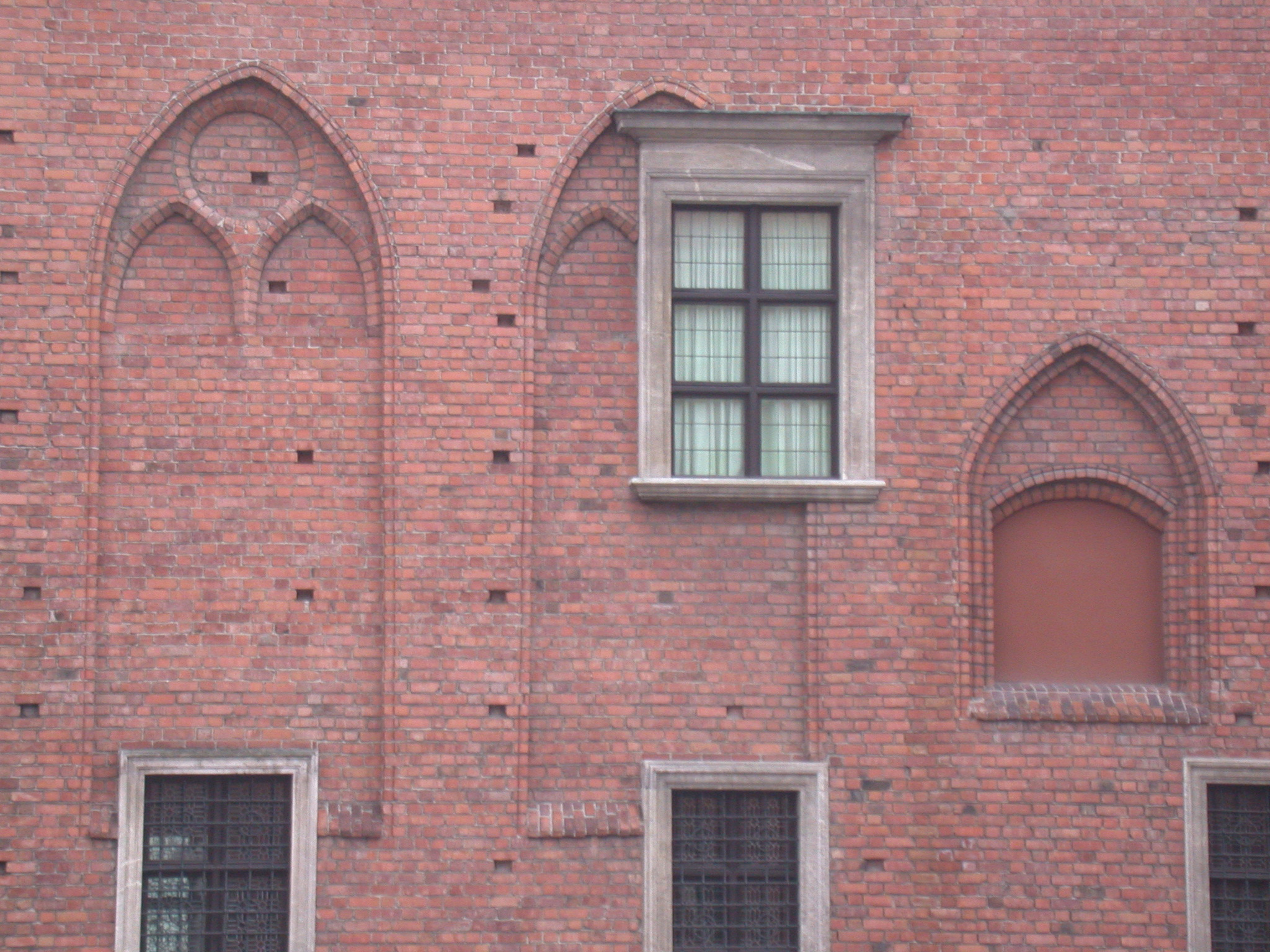
Medieval wall of the Curia Maior

In 1339, the Papal Legate in Warsaw heard a case brought by the King of Poland, Casimir III the Great, against the German Teutonic Order. He claimed that they had illegally seized a slice of Polish territory — the Pomerania and Kuyavia regions. The documents in this case are the earliest written testimony to the existence of Warsaw. At that time a fortified town surrounded by earthen and wooden ramparts, and situated where the Royal Castle now stands, it was the seat of Trojden, duke of Masovia. At the end of the 13th century, during the Duke Conrad's rule, the wooden-earthen gord called "Small Manor" (Latin: Curia Minor) was erected. The next duke, Casimir I, decided to build the Great Tower (Latin: Turris Magna), possibly one of the first brick building in Warsaw.

In the middle of the 14th century, the Castle Tower was built, and its remains up to the first storey have survived to this day. During the reign over Masovia by Duke Janusz I the Elder, the Curia Maior (Big Manor) was erected between 1407 and 1410. Its façade, which was still standing in 1944, was knocked down by the Germans, but has been rebuilt since then. The character of the new residence and its size (47.5 m/14.5 m) decided the change of the buildings status, and from 1414, it functioned as a Prince Manor.

=== Renaissance period ===
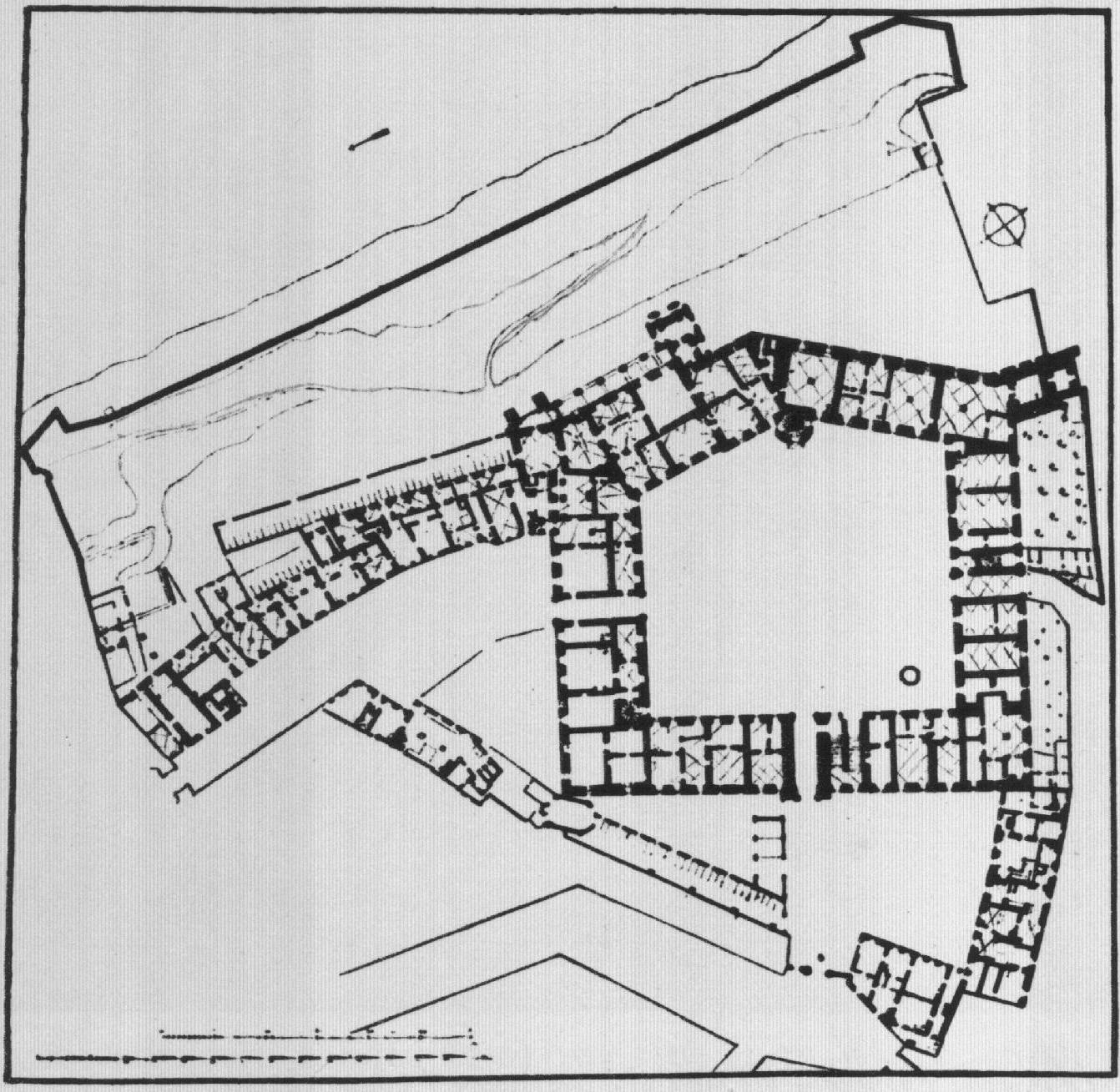
The Royal Castle in Warsaw after the extension c 1600. Plan from the beginning of the 17th century.

When the Duchy of Masovia was incorporated in the Kingdom of Poland in 1526, the edifice, which until then had been the Castle of the Dukes of Masovia, became one of the royal residences. From 1548 onwards Queen Bona Sforza resided in it with her daughters Izabela, who became Queen of Hungary, Catherine, later to become Queen of Sweden, and Anna Jagiellon, later Queen of Poland. In 1556–1557 and in 1564 Sigismund II Augustus, convened royal parliaments in Warsaw. They met in the castle. Following the Lublin Union (1569), by which the Polish Crown and the Grand Duchy of Lithuania – were united as a single country, Warsaw Castle was regularly the place where the parliament of the Two-Nations State met. In 1569–1572, King Sigismund II Augustus started alterations in the castle, the architects being Giovanni Battista di Quadro and Giacopo Pario.

The Curia Maior was altered so as provide a meeting place for the Parliament, with premises for the Chamber of Deputies (Sejm – delegates of the gentry) on the ground floor (the Old Chamber of Deputies), and the Senate Chamber (where the Senators debated in the presence of the King) on the first floor. This was one of the first attempts in Europe to create a building that would be used solely for parliamentary purposes. The parliamentary character of the Curia Maior is stressed by the paintings of the facade – the coats-of-arms of Poland, of Lithuania, and of the various regions from which the delegates were elected. A new Renaissance style building, known as the "Royal House", was erected next to the Curia Maior. The king resided there when the parliament was in session.

=== Vasa period and the Deluge ===
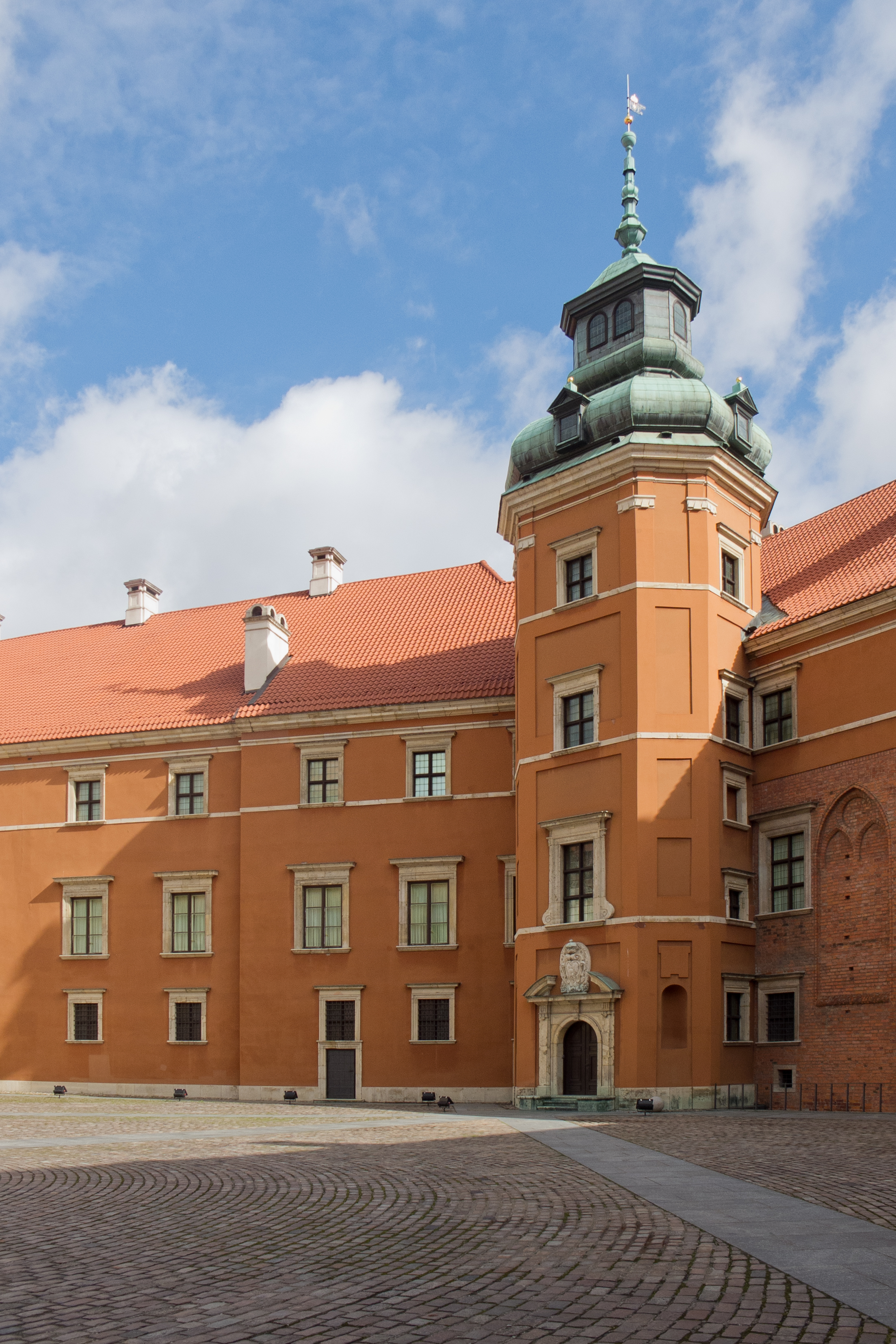
Władysław's Tower

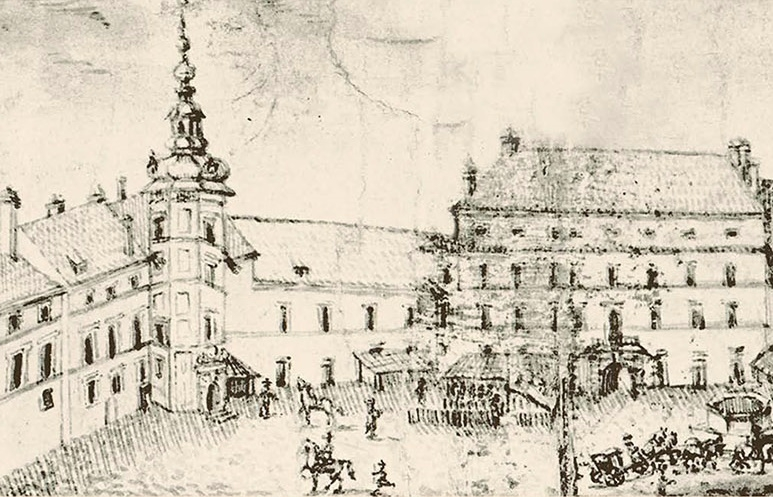
Władysław's Opera Hall

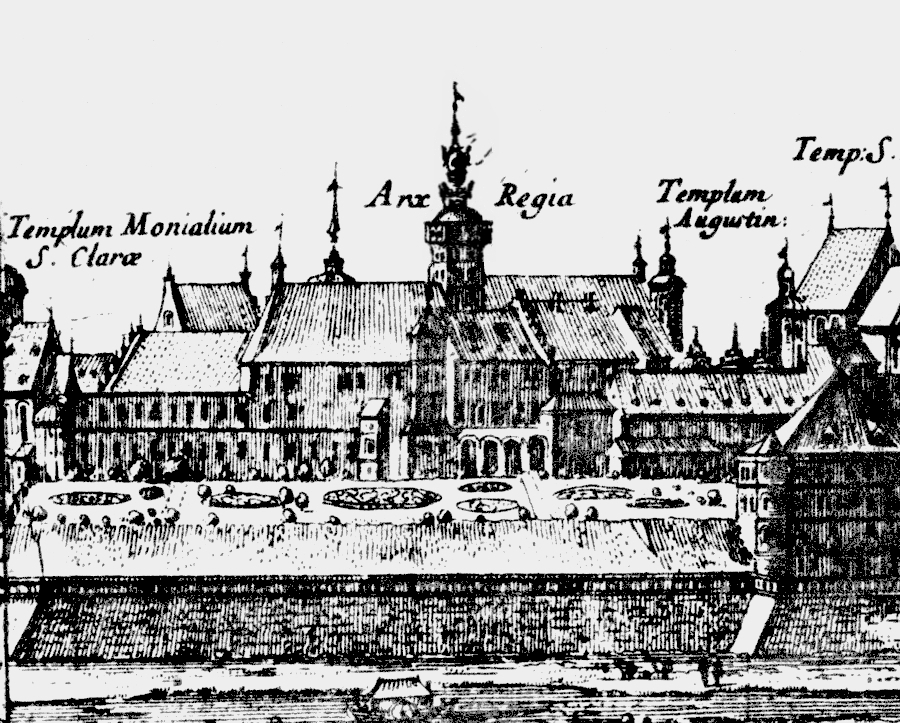
The Royal Castle in 1656

The next alterations to the castle were made in the reign of Sigismund III Vasa, who transferred the royal residence from Kraków to Warsaw. In 1598–1619, the castle was enlarged. Giovanni Trevano was in charge of the reconstruction. His plans were probably amended by the Venetian architect Vincenzo Scamozzi.

Between 1601 and 1603, Giacomo Rodondo finished the new northern wing. From 1602 Paolo del Corte was doing stonework. Later after 1614, when Matteo Castelli took the lead, the western wing was built (from today's Plac Zamkowy side) as chancelleries and a marshals office. The southern wing was built at the end. In that way, five-wings in a mannerist-early baroque style were built. In 1619, the New Royal Tower (Latin: Nova Turris Regia), also called Sigismund's Tower, was finished. It was 60 meters high and was placed in the middle of a newly built west castle 90 meters in length. At the top of the tower, a clock with gilded hands and copper face was placed. The new tower's spire was 13 meters high and had glided knobs and a copper flag at the top.

On 29 October 1611 in the Senator's Chamber, Tsar Vasili IV of Russia, who had been captured by the hetman Stanisław Żółkiewski, paid homage to the Polish king Sigismund III Vasa.

Sigismund III and his successors of the Vasa dynasty — Władysław IV Vasa and John II Casimir Vasa — collected many rich works of art in the castle, such as oriental fabrics, tapestries, and numerous paintings by such famous artists as Titian, Veronese, Jacopo and Leandro Bassano, Tintoretto, Palma il Giovane, Antonio Vassilacchi, Tommaso Dolabella, Guercino, Guido Reni, Joseph Heintz the Elder, Bartholomeus Spranger, Roelant Savery, Rembrandt, Pieter Soutman, Peter Danckerts de Rij, Peter Paul Rubens, Jan Brueghel the Elder, Daniel Seghers, Georg Daniel Schultz and sculptures by Giambologna, Giovanni Francesco Susini and Adriaen de Vries. These splendid works of art were either destroyed or plundered during the invasions of Poland by Sweden and Russia during the Deluge, in 1655–1657. The Swedes took all the priceless pictures, furniture, tapestries, the royal library, the crown archive, numerous sculptures, whole floors and royal flags. In the castle they had a military Lazareth field hospital, which additionally contributed to the devastation of the buildings. A few months later armies destroyed the rest, plundering most of the copper elements and tearing up the rest of castle's floor.

The majority of the preserved castle furnishings from the Vasa period found their place in the collection of the Visitationist Monastery in Warsaw as donations from the last Vasa, John II Casimir and his French-born wife Marie Louise Gonzaga.

In 1628, the first Polish opera – Galatea, was staged at the Castle. The great opera hall (double-storied, over 50 m long), which existed at the Royal Castle, was demolished by Swedes and Germans and rebuilt in the 1660s by King John II Casimir.

=== Late Baroque period ===
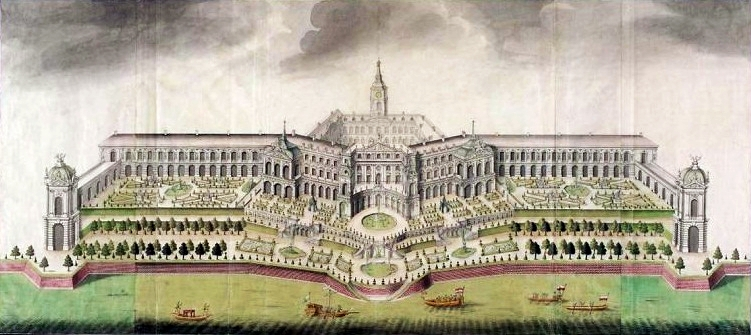
Reconstruction design of the Royal Castle, c. 1700.

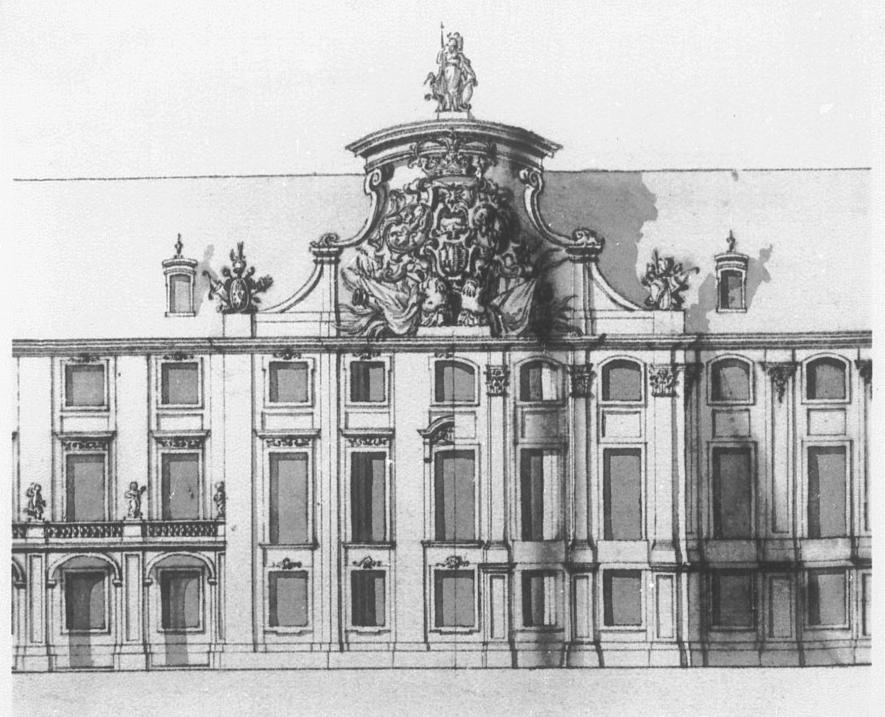
Design of the Eastern wing by G. Chiaveri.

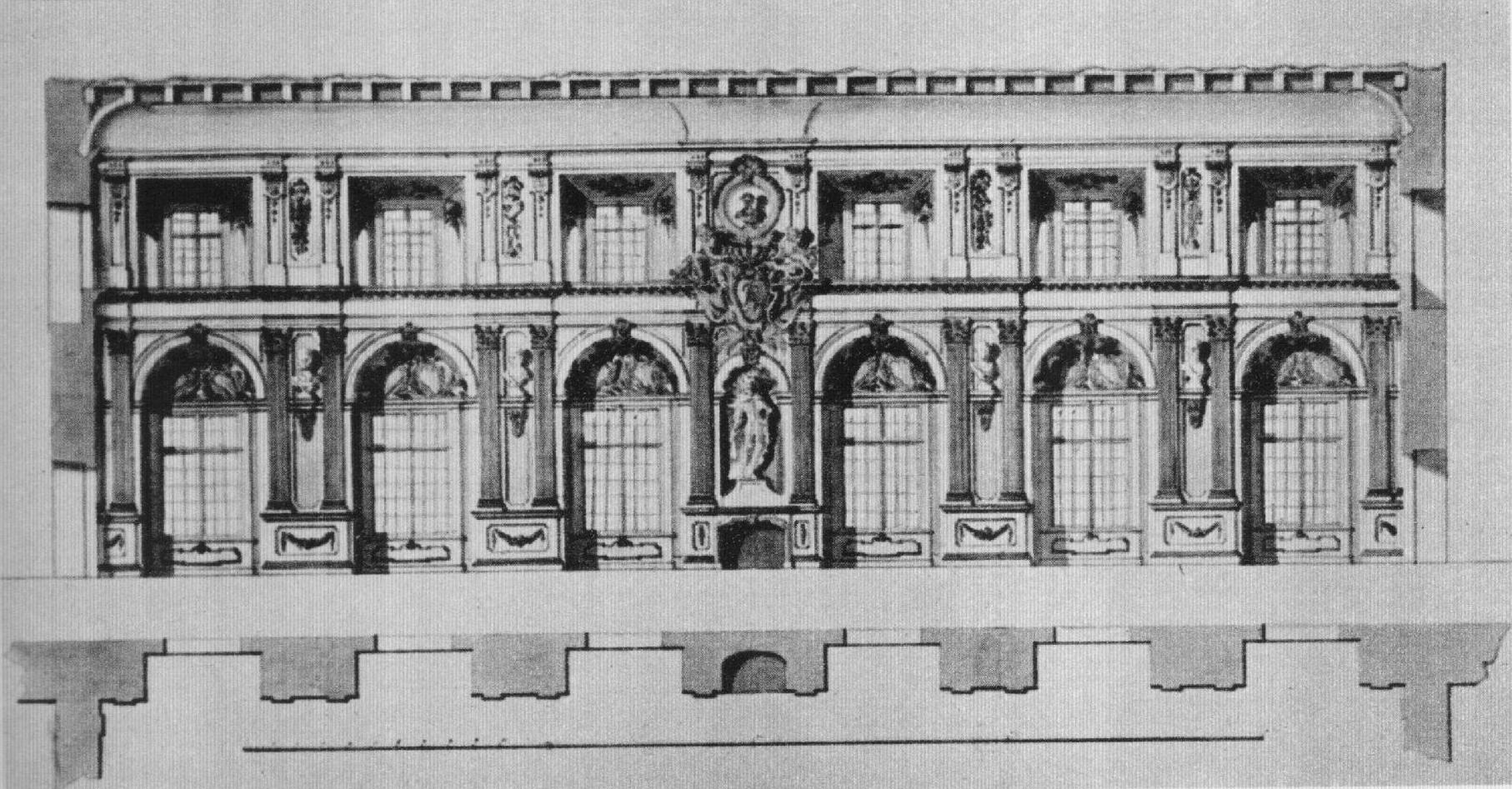
Senate Chamber at the Royal Castle, 1720.

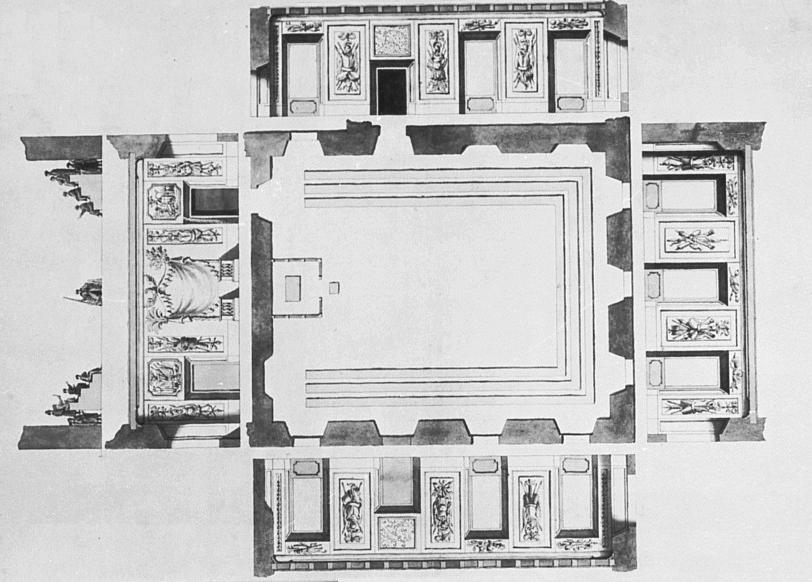
The New Chamber of Deputies at the Royal Castle in the end of the 17th century.

In 1657, the reconstruction of the castle started, under the Italian architect Izydor Affait's guidance. Because of the lack of money, the following Polish king, Michael I Korybut did not decide on radical rebuilding, just limiting himself to rebuilding destroyed buildings. Because of the bad conditions of the residence, he had to move to Ujazdów Castle in 1669. Until 1696, when the next Polish king, John III Sobieski, died, no serious works were done. They only limited work to current inspections of the building's condition. Sessions of Parliament continued to be held in the castle, as well as various State occasions, such as when the Hohenzollern dukes of Prussia paid homage to the kings of Poland and occasions when the king received the ambassadors of foreign countries.

After choosing Augustus II in an election in 1697, the castle again began to deteriorate. A new conflict with Charles XII of Sweden significantly limited the king's budget. Despite problems, in 1698 Augustus II commissioned a residence reconstruction project. In 1700 it was done by Johann Friedrich Karcher, who came from abroad. On 25 May 1702 the Swedes re-seized the Royal Castle in Warsaw, creating a hospital with 500 beds, and into the Chamber of Deputies and ministers' rooms, they placed a stable. During the Polish army's siege in 1704 the castle was retaken. However, it was soon retaken once more by Sweden's army. In 1707, by virtue of the peace treaty between Augustus II and Charles XII of Sweden, Russian allied troops entered Warsaw, and Tsar Peter I of Russia settled in the castle. After two months, Russian forces were removed from Warsaw, taking with them works of art from the castle, including Tommaso Dolabella's pictures, which included two that were very important for Russians: The Defense of Smolensk and Russian Tsar Vasili IV compelled to kneel before Polish King Sigismund III of Poland. Władysław IV's Opera Hall was completely devastated and was never restored.

The reconstruction according to Karcher's plans began from 1713 to 1715. In 1717 the Parliament Hall was completely rebuilt. It was used to serve the Saxon rulers as a coronation hall. During the following years, between 1722 and 1723, the other castle halls were converted-under the direction of architect Joachim Daniel von Jauch, the new Senate Chamber was built, and all the furnishings moved from the old to the new location, including among others: 60 Polish provincial emblems, panelling, mouldings and lesene. On 31 May 1732, a fire broke out in the castle destroying the west elevation and part of the Sigismund's Tower and the exterior façade sculptures, known as armature.

The next reconstruction project of the Royal Castle appeared after Augustus III was elected to the Polish throne in 1733. New plans, which were formed in 1734 and developed in 1737 by architect Gaetano Chiaveri, saw among other things, the reconstruction of the castle's façade on the Vistula side in the rococo style, which was meant to form a new so called Saxon elevation and also the conversion of the north-east part with the Altana Tower, where it was planned for 3 two-storey avant-corps (risalto) to be built on. The reconstruction work according to these plans was carried out with various intensity between 1740 and 1752. During the period of 1740–1747, the façade on the Vistula side was reconstructed in the late baroque style (architects: Gaetano Chiaveri, Carl Friedrich Pöppelmann, Jan Krzysztof Knöffel). One of the best sculptors who did work on the castle in this period was Jan Jerzy Plersch, who made the royal decorative frames, mouldings and statues called the Famous Figures, which held the royal crowns on the top of the middle risalto, of the Saxon elevation, on the Vistula side. The last reconstruction work of this period was finished by late 1763, after the death of Augustus III, when Plersch made the last sculptures and frames with province emblems for the Parliament Hall.

=== Enlightenment period ===
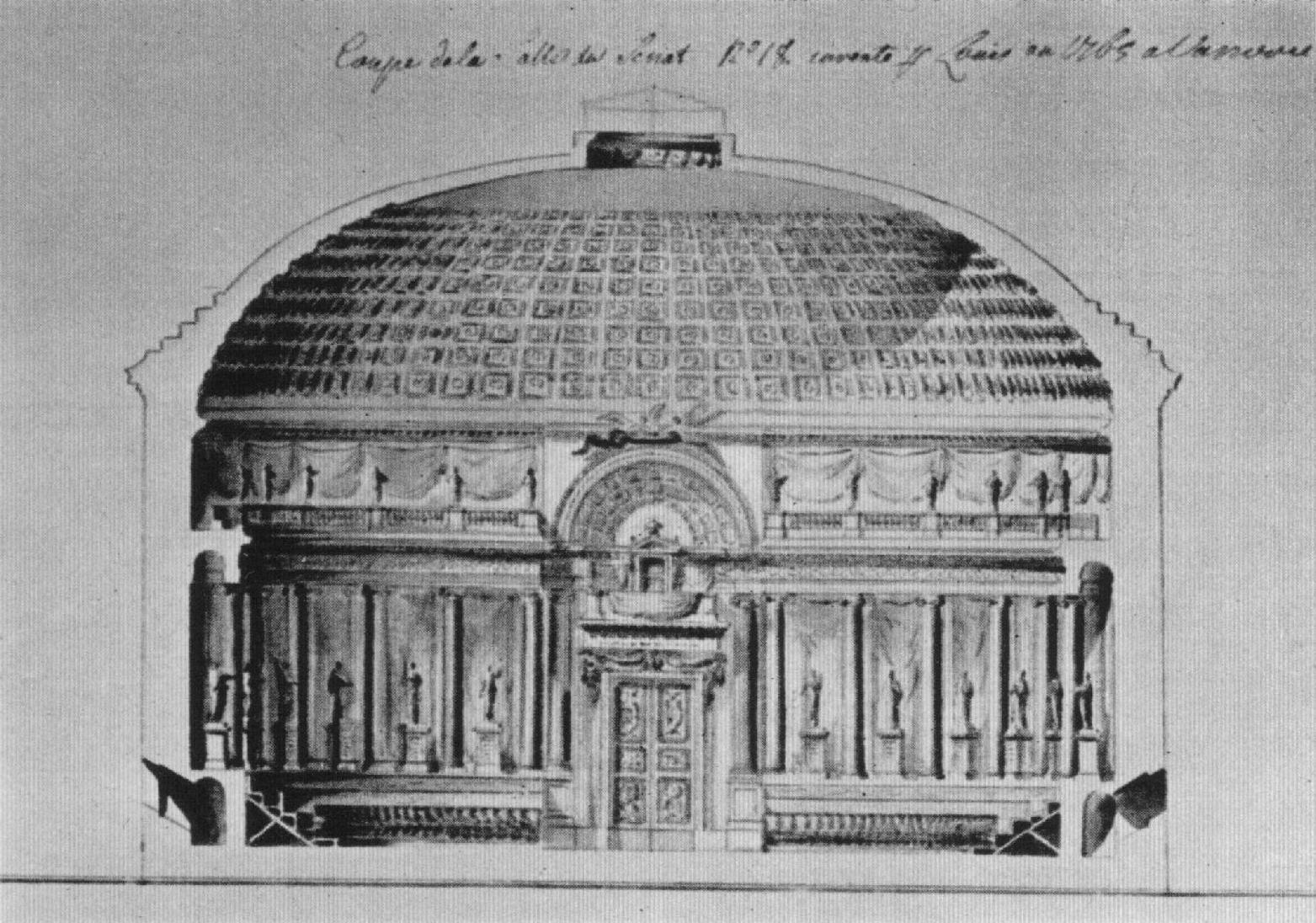
Reconstruction design of the Senate Chamber at the Royal Castle, V. Louis.

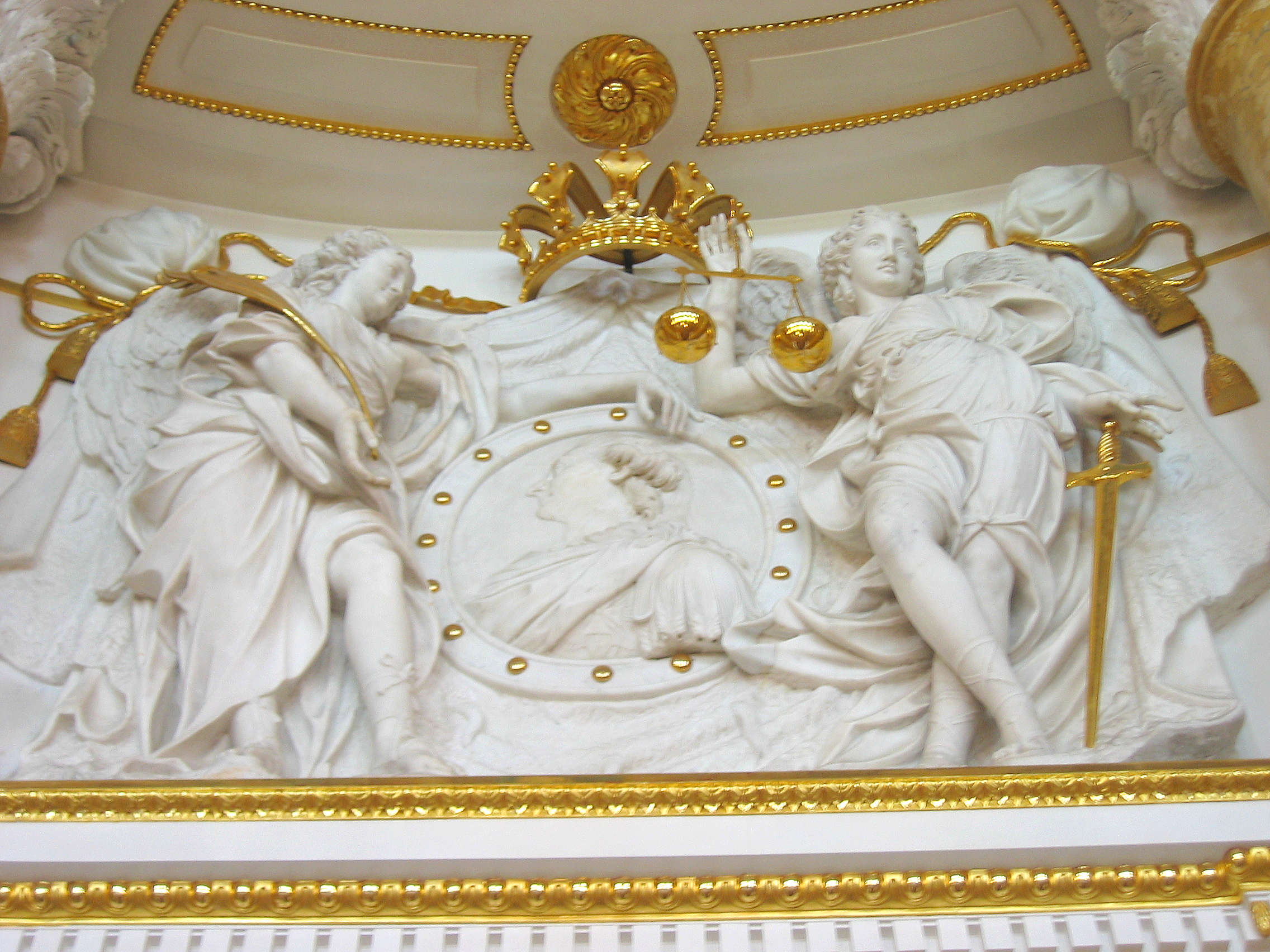
Apotheosis of King Stanisław II Augustus in the Ballroom, André le Brun, ca. 1780.

The most splendid period in the history of the Castle was during the rule of Stanisław II Augustus (1764–1795). This monarch collected exquisite works of art, many of which have survived to this day. He recruited first-rate architects such as Jakub Fontana, Domenico Merlini, Jan Chrystian Kamsetzer, and Jakub Kubicki, to work on the castle, as well as splendid painters such as Marcello Bacciarelli, Bernardo Bellotto, Franciszek Smuglewicz, Kazimierz Wojniakowski, and Jean-Baptiste Pillement and eminent sculptors such as André-Jean Lebrun and Jakub Monaldi, and famous French artists such as the architect Victor Louis. The total reconstruction of the castle planned by the King did not come to fruition, but the interior was changed to the neoclassical style – although this, known in Poland as the Stanisław Augustus style, was rather different from neoclassicism in the rest of Europe.

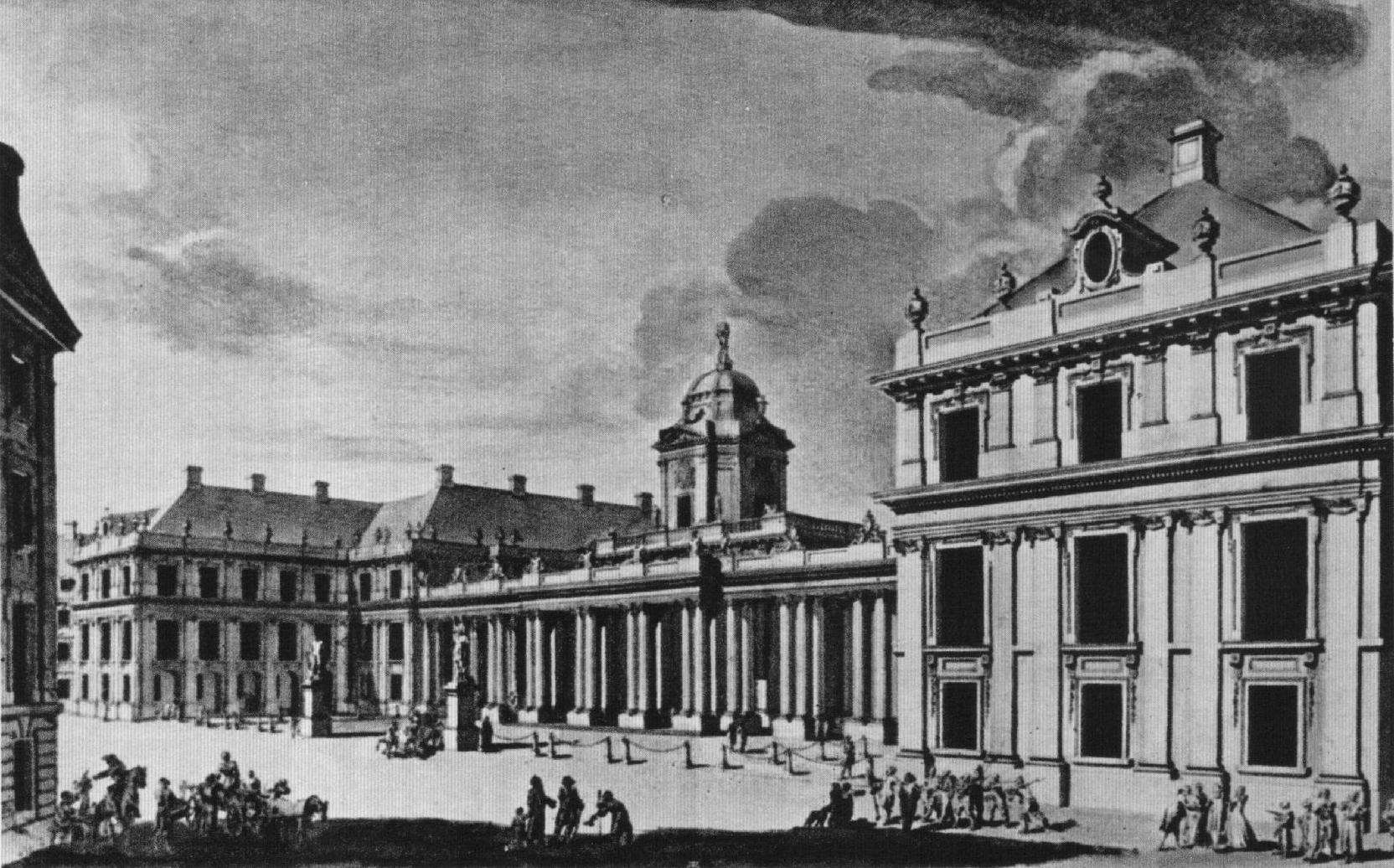
Reconstruction design of the Royal Castle in Warsaw by J. Fontana

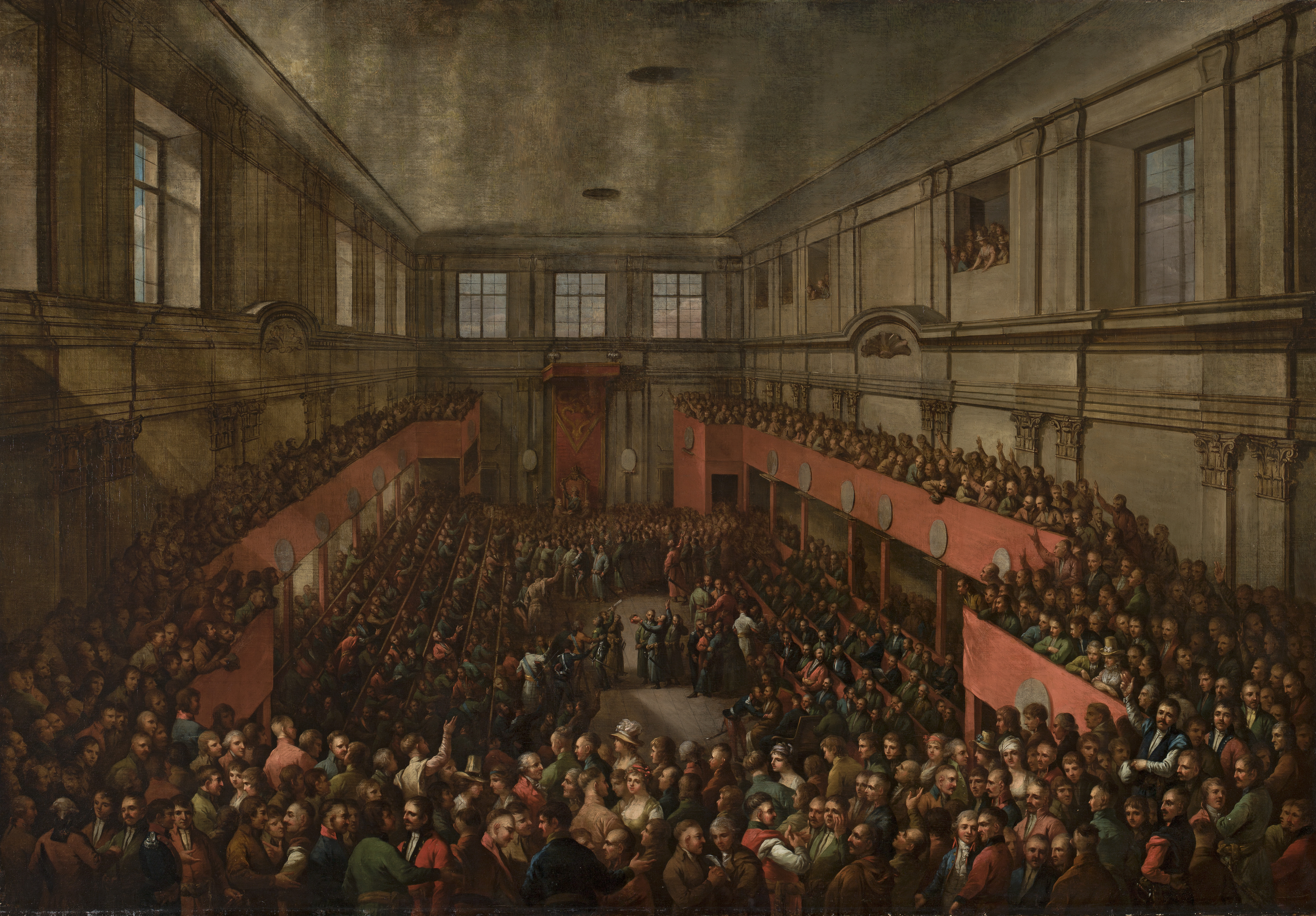
In 1791, the Great Sejm (or Four-Year Sejm) of 1788–1792 and Senate adopt the May 3rd Constitution at the Royal Castle.

During 1766–1785 on the basis of Jakub Fontana's plans, the southern wing of the castle, which was burnt on 15 December 1767 was rebuilt (2 destroyed floors, a new elevation on the south side with three avant-corps or risalti, the division of the façade by lesene and pilasters with Ionic capitals). Between 1774 and 1777, the monarch's private apartments were furnished. They consisted of the Prospect Room (with landscapes by Canaletto), the chapel, the Audience Chamber, and the Bedchamber, while between 1779 and 1786 the Senate Apartments were completed, consisting of the Ballroom, the Knights Hall, the Throne Room, the Marble Room, and the Conference Chamber. These rooms contained pictures and sculptures depicting great events in Poland's history, as well as portraits of Polish kings, generals, statesmen and scholars (including Copernicus and Adam Naruszewicz). In 1777, a gilded bronze altar presented to King Stanisław II Augustus by Pope Clement XIV, was installed in the new Chapel of the Royal Castle, so-called Saxon Chapel (today's concert hall). The castle also housed the rich royal collections including 3200 pictures, classical statues, about 100 000 graphics, in addition to medals, coins, and a fine library, to house which a separate building was erected in 1780–1784. The new library building housed many books, gems, drawings, coins, maps and plans belonging to the monarch. The Royal Library's book collection amounted to 16 000 volumes of various works, 25,525 drawings, 44,842 etchings in 726 bound volumes, overall a number of 70,000 etchings—fancy dress balls were also held in this hall.

Up until 1786 Stanisław II Augustus tried a few times to change the outside decor of the castle and to build an architectural castle square, he was not however successful in carrying out these plans.

During this period, the castle was the place where the ideas of the Polish Enlightenment first flourished. The King held "Thursday lunches" at the Castle for scientists, scholars, writers, and artists. This was where the idea for the National Education Commission; one of the first secular Ministries of Education in Europe, was mooted. The castle was the place where the first proposals were made for a Knights' School, and for a national theatre. It was in the Senate Chamber in the Castle that what was known as the "Great Sejm" (Great Parliament) passed the famous Polish Constitution of 3 May, 1791. During the ceremony the King was carried out to the nearby church of St. John. In honour of this occasion, a marble plaque with Ignacy Krasicki's text written on it was set into the wall of the castle.

=== In partitioned Poland and the Second Polish Republic ===
Between 19 and 20 December 1806 and 1–30 January 1807, Napoleon Bonaparte, the French emperor, spent his time at the castle. Here in 1807 he made the decision to form the Duchy of Warsaw, which was to be ruled by the Saxon king Frederick August I, using the Royal Castle as his residence. Prince Józef Poniatowski, Commander-in-Chief of the Army of the Duchy of Warsaw and Marshal of France, resided in the Copper-Roof Palace joined to the castle. After the creation of the constitutional Kingdom of Poland (1815), its parliaments met here at the castle. As kings of Poland, the Russian Tsars Alexander I and Nicholas I also resided in the castle when they stayed in Warsaw. During the November Uprising, on 25 January 1831, the Sejm debating in the castle dethroned Tsar Nicholas I as Polish king.

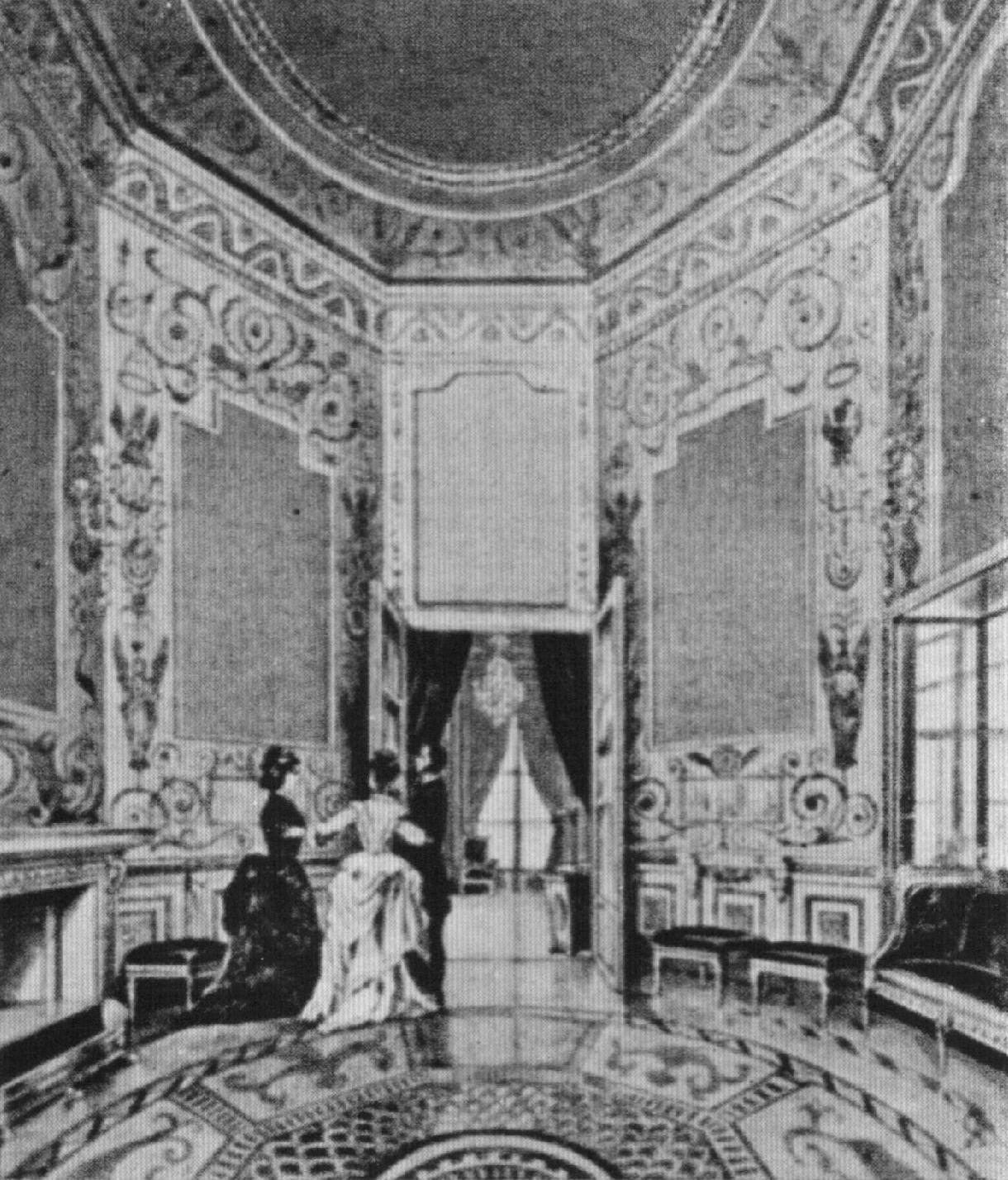
Conference Room at the castle without paintings that were stolen by the Tsarist army.

In 1836, the voivodeships of Congress Poland were abolished and replaced by guberniyas. During that time, the Royal Castle became the residence of the Tsar's governor Ivan Paskievich. Paskievich charged Ludvik Corio – a Russian Colonel and architect – with designing new elevations and façades (the west, south, and east parts). However, the Russian authorities were not satisfied with the new designs, and Corio was told to prepare another design – one that would refer to Kubicki's solutions (and his co-workers Lelewel and Thomas). Finally, Corio rebuilt all the elevations and façades in the neoclassical style, but the Saxon Elevation was left the same. After the death of Paskievich in 1856, all the next governors resided in the Royal Castle's Chamberlain's Room. The Russian officials occupied rooms on both floors of the west and north wings of the castle. The governors were heavily guarded by the Russian army. Unfortunately, the living space that was assigned to these soldiers was the Parliamentary Hall, Library, and barracks under the castle. As a result, these were left devastated.

After the January Uprising in 1863, the Russian army totally destroyed the Royal garden on the Vistula side (which was transformed into the military parade square), building a few barracks made of brick for stables and Cossacks' barracks. In 1862–1863, some maintenance work was done in the Royal Castle under the supervision of Jerzy Orłowicz, Ludwik Gosławski and Potolov. In 1890, the Saxon Elevation was rebuilt under the supervision of a builder January Kiślański, when the arcades of both viewing galleries, dating back to the Augustus III period, were deformed. The last repair works, which cost 28,000 rubles, during the reign of Russia, were in 1902 in the rooms which had been occupied by the Russian army.

During the First World War, it was the residence of the German military governor. After Poland regained her independence in 1918, the castle became the residence of the president of Poland. It was restored under the guidance of Kazimierz Skórewicz (1920–1928) and Adolf Szyszko-Bohusz (until 1939). Under the terms of the peace treaty signed with Soviet Russia at Riga in 1921, works of art and other precious things, including all the castle furnishings, which had been taken away to Russia, were brought back to Poland. As a result, it was possible to restore the historic rooms to their appearance in the reign of Stanisław II Augustus.

=== During World War II ===
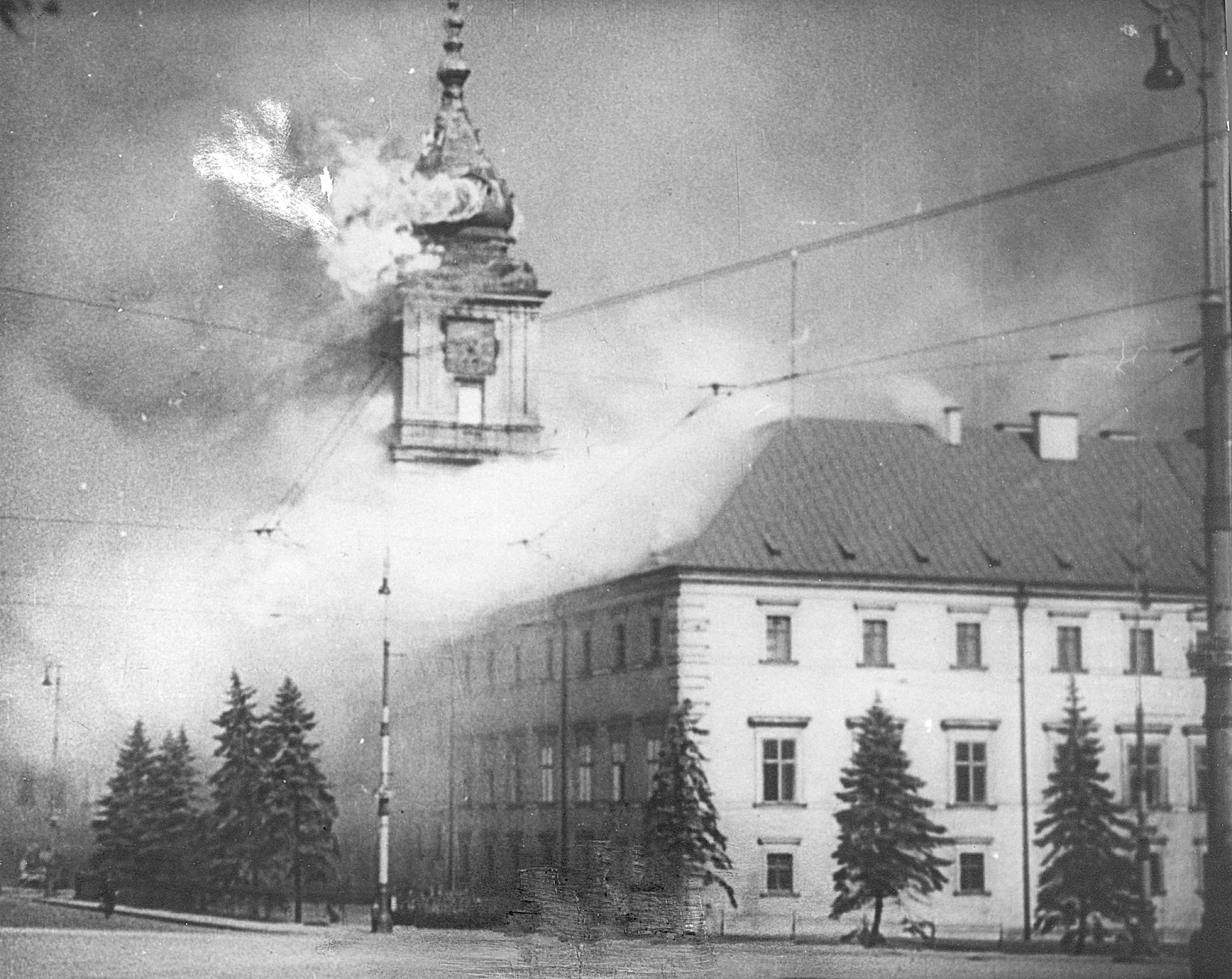
Royal Castle in flames following German bombardment, 17 September 1939.

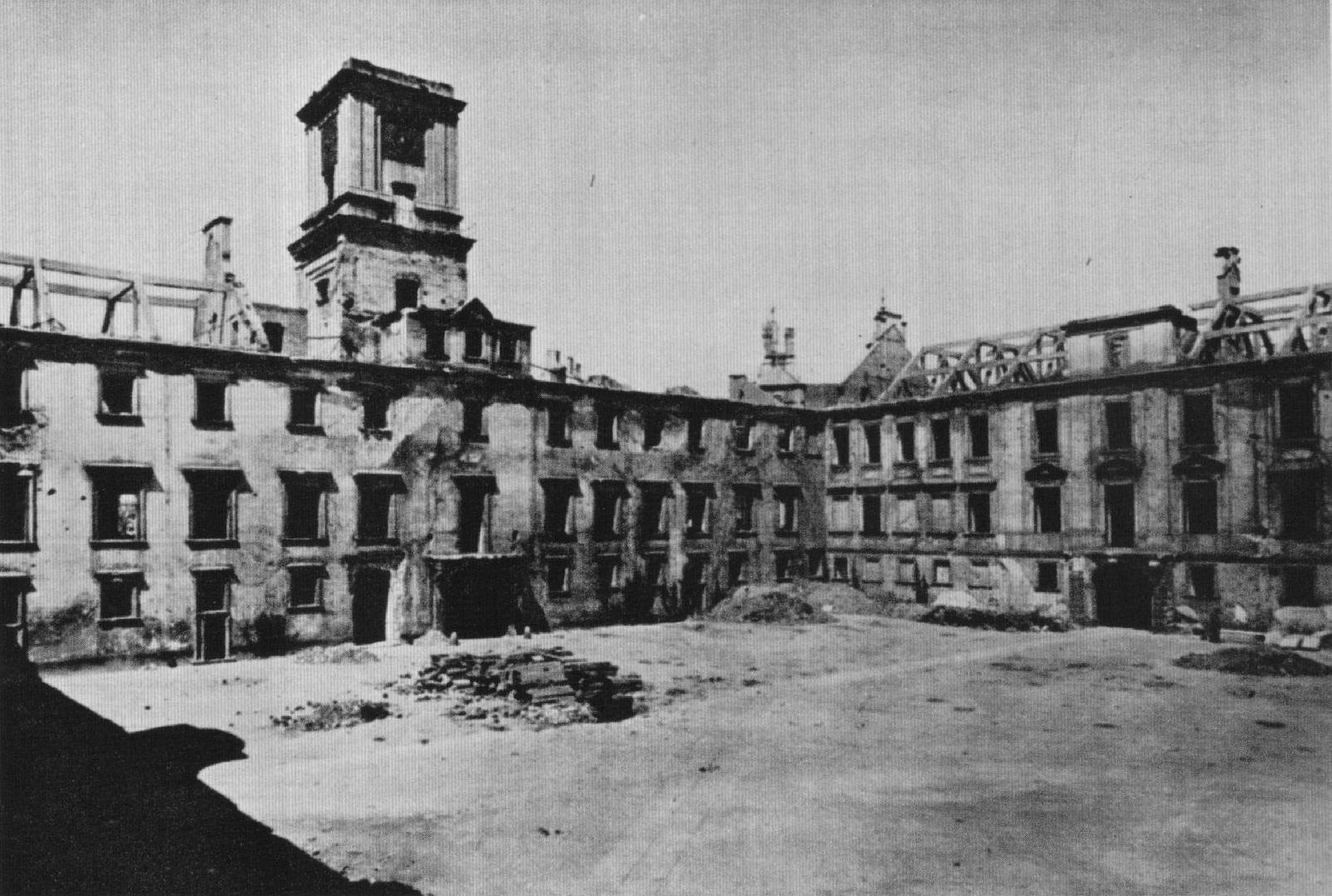
Royal Castle in 1941 without roofs, deliberately removed by the Germans to accelerate the devastation process.

On 17 September 1939, the castle was shelled by German artillery. The roof and the turrets were destroyed by fire (they were partly restored by the castle's staff, but later deliberately removed by the Germans). The ceiling of the Ballroom collapsed, resulting in the destruction of Marcello Bacciarelli's ceiling fresco The Creation of the World and other rooms were slightly damaged. But immediately after the seizure of Warsaw by the Germans, their occupation troops set to demolish the castle. The more valuable objects, even including the central heating and ventilation installations, were dismantled and taken away to Germany.

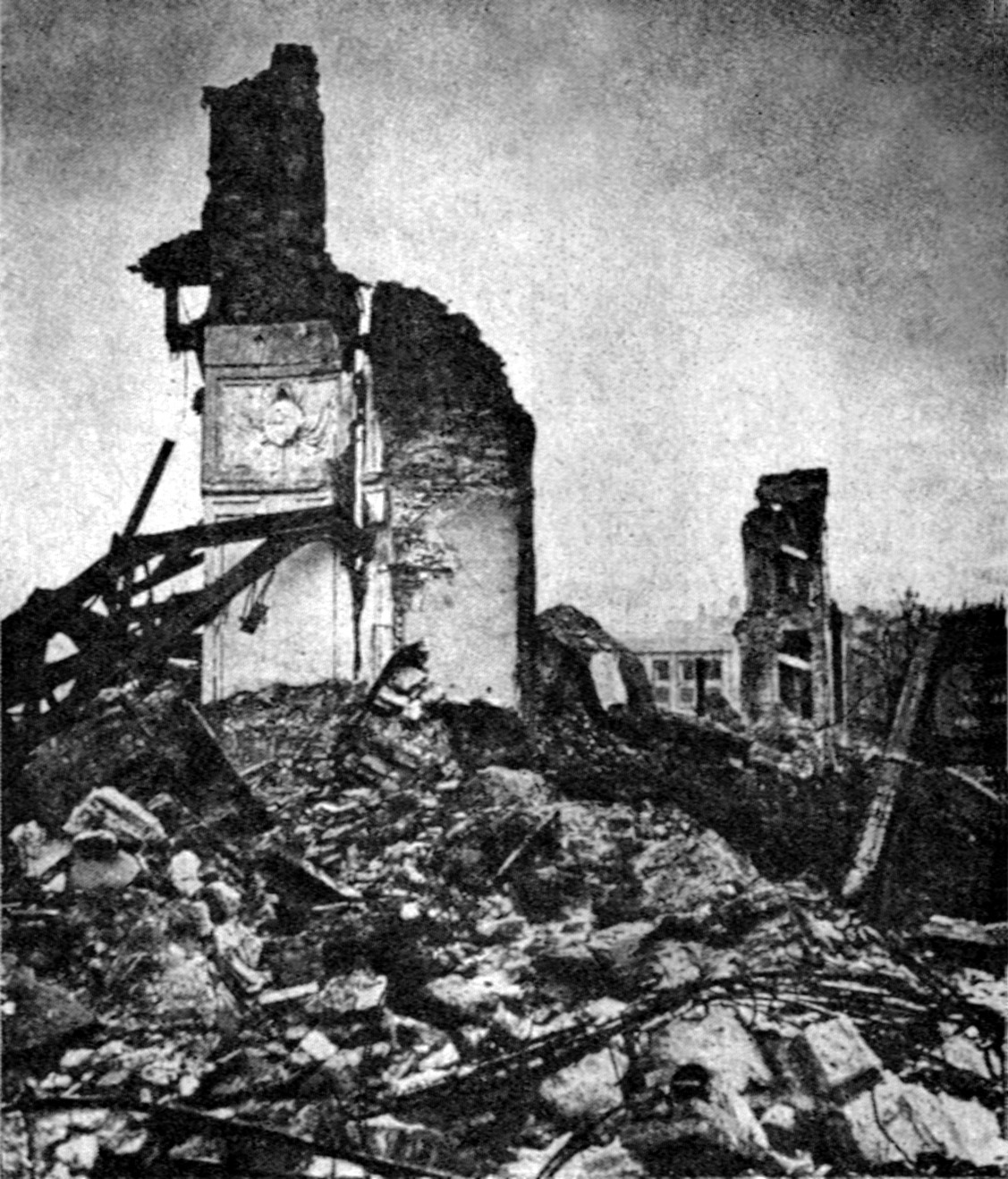
Ruins of the castle in 1945.

On 4 October 1939 in Berlin, Adolf Hitler issued the order to blow up the Royal Castle. On 10 October 1939, special German units, under the supervision of history and art experts (Dr. Dagobert Frey, an art historian at the University of Breslau; Gustaw Barth, the director of museums in Breslau, and Dr. Joseph Mühlmann, an art historian from Vienna) started to demount floors, marbles, sculptures, and stone elements such as fireplaces or moulds. The artefacts were taken to Germany or stored in Kraków's warehouses. Many of them were also seized by various Nazi dignitaries who resided in Warsaw. The castle was totally emptied. Disobeying German orders, despite the danger of being shot, Polish museum staff and experts in art restoration managed to save many of the works of art from the castle, as well as fragments of the stucco-work, the parquet floors, the wood panelling, and more which were later used in the reconstruction. The great service done to Poland by Professor Stanisław Lorentz, in leading this campaign to save the castle's treasures, is well known. Wehrmacht sappers then bored tens of thousands of holes for dynamite charges in the stripped walls.

In 1944, after the collapse of the Warsaw Uprising, when hostilities had already ceased, the Germans blew up the castle's demolished walls. Leveling the Royal Castle was only a part of a larger plan – the Pabst Plan – the goal of which was to build a monumental Community Hall (ger. Volkshalle) or an equally sizable Congress Hall of NSDAP (National Socialist German Workers Party – ger. Parteivolkshalle) in the Royal Castle's place and to replace Sigismund's Column with the Germania Monument.

A pile of rubble, surmounted by only two fragments of walls, was all that was left of the six-hundred-year-old edifice. On one of these fragments part of the stucco decoration remained, this was a cartouche with the royal version of the motto of the Order of the White Eagle — "PRO FIDE, LEGE ET REGE" (for Faith, Law, and King).

=== Reconstruction ===
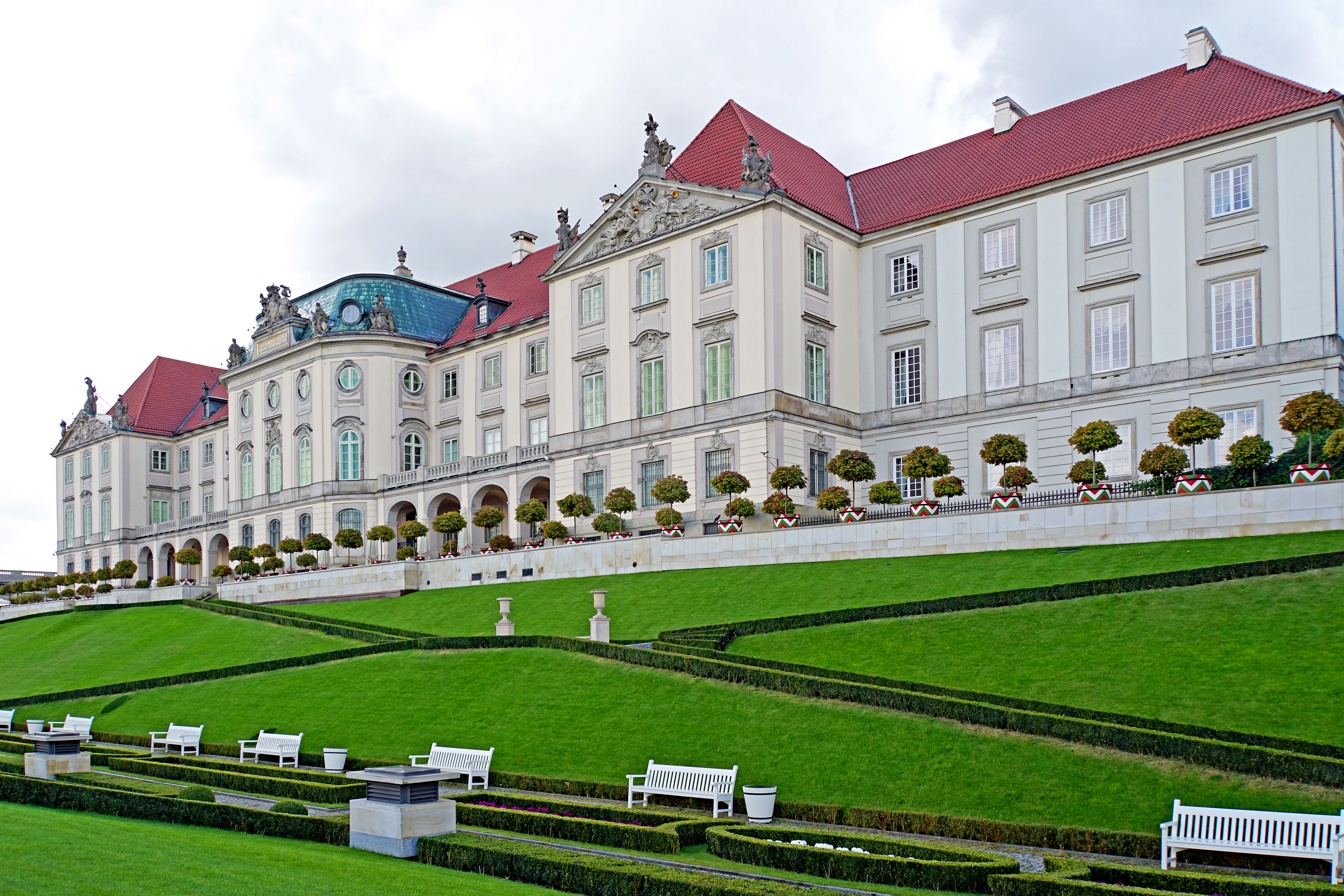
The reconstructed Upper Garden of the Royal Castle

Immediately after the end of war in 1945, work started on rescuing the surviving fragments of the castle's walls, foundations, and cellars as well as the fire-blackened walls of the Copper-Roof Palace and the Royal Library building, from further destruction. In 1949, the Polish Parliament passed a bill to rebuild the castle as a monument to Polish history and culture. Meanwhile, special architectural designing offices, under Jan Dąbrowski, Piotr Biegański and Jan Zachwatowicz, drew up blueprints for restoring the framework of the building and furnishing the historical rooms. The decision to start work was postponed several times, but was finally taken on 20 January 1971. A Civic Committee was set up. Amid universal applause, it was decided to rebuild the castle from voluntary contributions. Both in Poland and abroad, fund-raising committees were set up.

By May 1975, the Fund had already reached the 500 million zlotys. By the same date more than a thousand valuable works of art had been given to the castle by numerous Poles resident both in Poland and abroad. Official representatives of other countries have likewise presented to the castle works of art of great artistic and historic value.

== Today ==
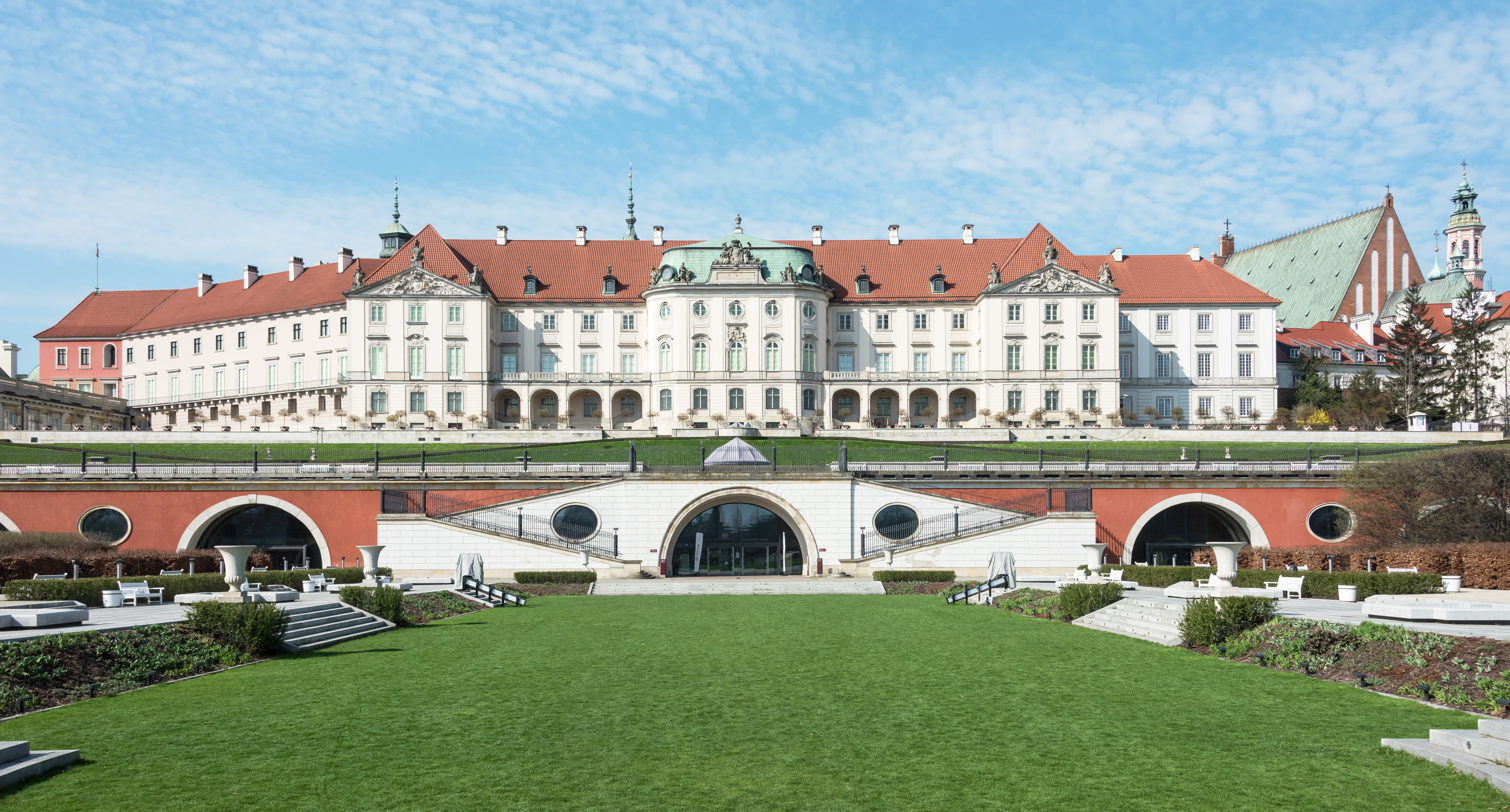
Royal Castle's eastern baroque façade seen from the Royal Gardens.

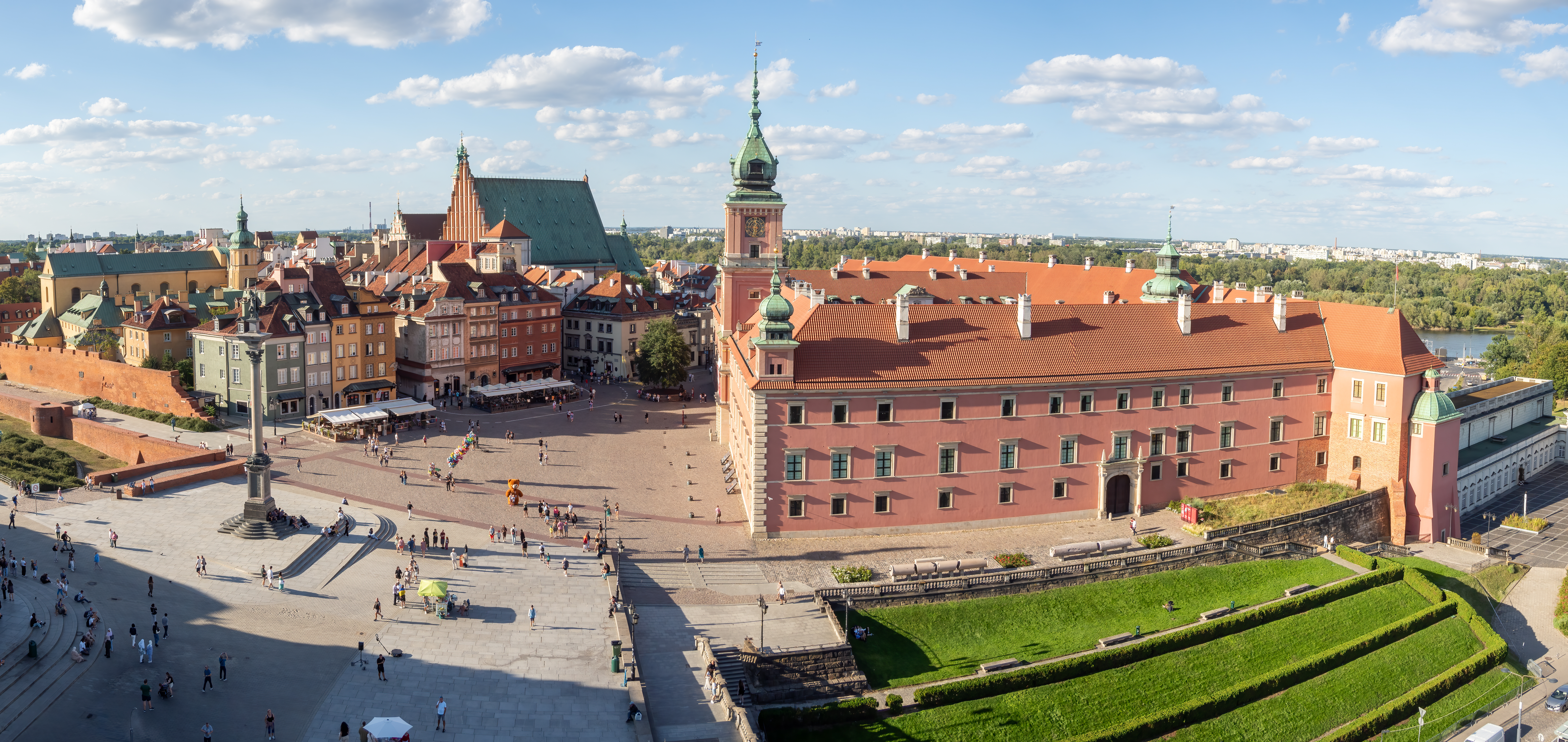
Panoramic view of the castle and the Old Town.

The imposing façade, built of brick, is 90 metres (300 ft) long and faces the Castle Square. At each end of the façade stands a square tower with a bulbous spire. The Sigismund's Tower is located in the centre of the main façade, flanked on both sides by the castle. This huge clock tower (60 metres (200 ft) in height), designed in the 17th century, has always been a symbol of the Polish capital and source of inspiration for the architects of other buildings in Warsaw. The castle now serves as a museum and is subordinated to the Ministry of Culture and National Heritage. Many official visits and state meetings are also held in the Royal Castle.

== Interior ==
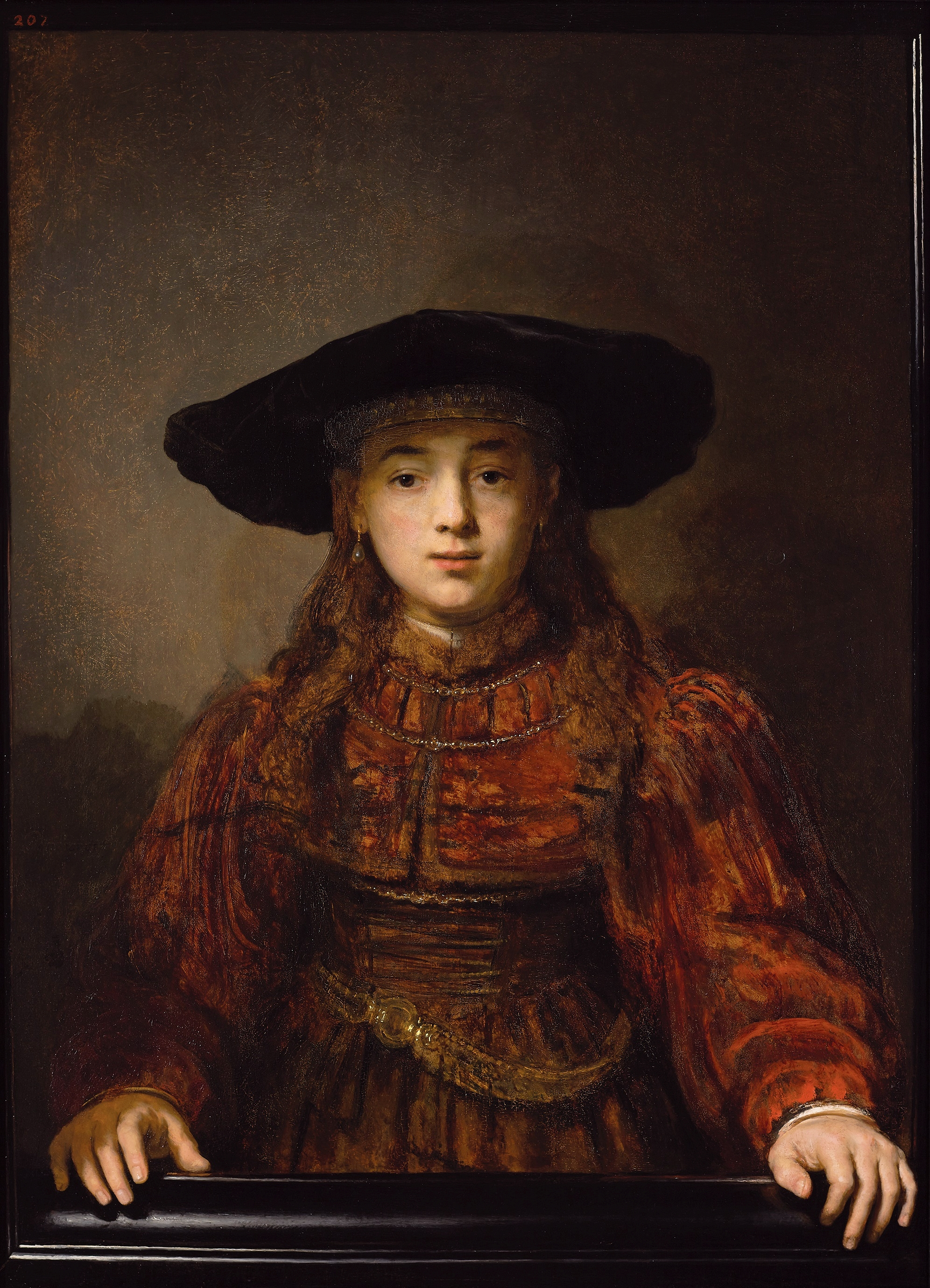
The Girl in a Picture Frame [1641] by Rembrandt. One of two pieces of that artist at the castle from Stanisław Augustus' collection.

The interior consists of many different rooms, all painstakingly restored with as many original exhibits as possible after the destruction of the Second World War.

- The Jagiellonian Rooms

These rooms, which belonged to the residence of Sigismund Augustus, are now host to a number of portraits of the Jagiellon dynasty, a royal dynasty originating in Lithuania that reigned in several Central European countries between the 14th and 16th century. In 2011, the Jagiellonian Rooms were re-arranged to house the modern Gallery of Painting, Sculpture and Decorative Arts.

- The Houses of Parliament

From the 16th century onwards, Polish democracy started here. In 1573, amendments to the constitution of the Polish–Lithuanian Commonwealth were written here, with great religious tolerance. Also in 1652 the Sejm was distrupted for the first time by the use of liberum veto in these rooms. In 1791, the May Constitution, Europe's first modern codified national constitution as well as the second-oldest national constitution in the world, was drafted here. The decorations in the room are replicas of the originals by Giovanni Battista di Quadro.

- The Royal Apartments

In these apartments, King Stanisław Augustus Poniatowski lived. They consist of the Canaletto room, in which several painted views of Warsaw are on display. These were not painted by Canaletto, but rather by his nephew, Bernardo Bellotto also called il Canaletto. Jean-Baptiste Pillement worked between 1765 and 1767 on one of his largest projects, the wallpaper. Domenico Merlini designed the adjacent Royal Chapel in 1776. Nowadays, the heart of Tadeusz Kościuszko is kept here in an urn. The Audience Rooms are also designed by Merlini, with four paintings by Marcello Bacciarelli on display. Andrzej Grzybowski took care of the restoration of the room, that included many original pieces.

- Lanckoroński Collection

In 1994, Countess Karolina Lanckorońska donated 37 pictures to the Royal Castle. Collection includes two paintings (portraits) by Rembrandt: The Father of the Jewish Bride (also known as The Scholar at the Lectern) and The Jewish Bride (also known as The Girl in a Picture Frame) both originally in the Stanisław Augustus Poniatowski collection.

In December 2018, the castle acquired a violin created by Antonio Stradivari in 1685. To commemorate the 100th anniversary of Poland regaining its independence, the instrument was officially given the name Polonia. The virtuoso violinist Jerzy Wawrowski is the only person who is allowed to play on the instrument.

In December 2018, a painting by Marcello Bacciarelli titled Portrait of Jerzy Mniszech with Daughter Elizabeth and Kiopek (1795), which was considered missing, was returned to the castle's collections.

== Gallery ==
The Interior of the Castle

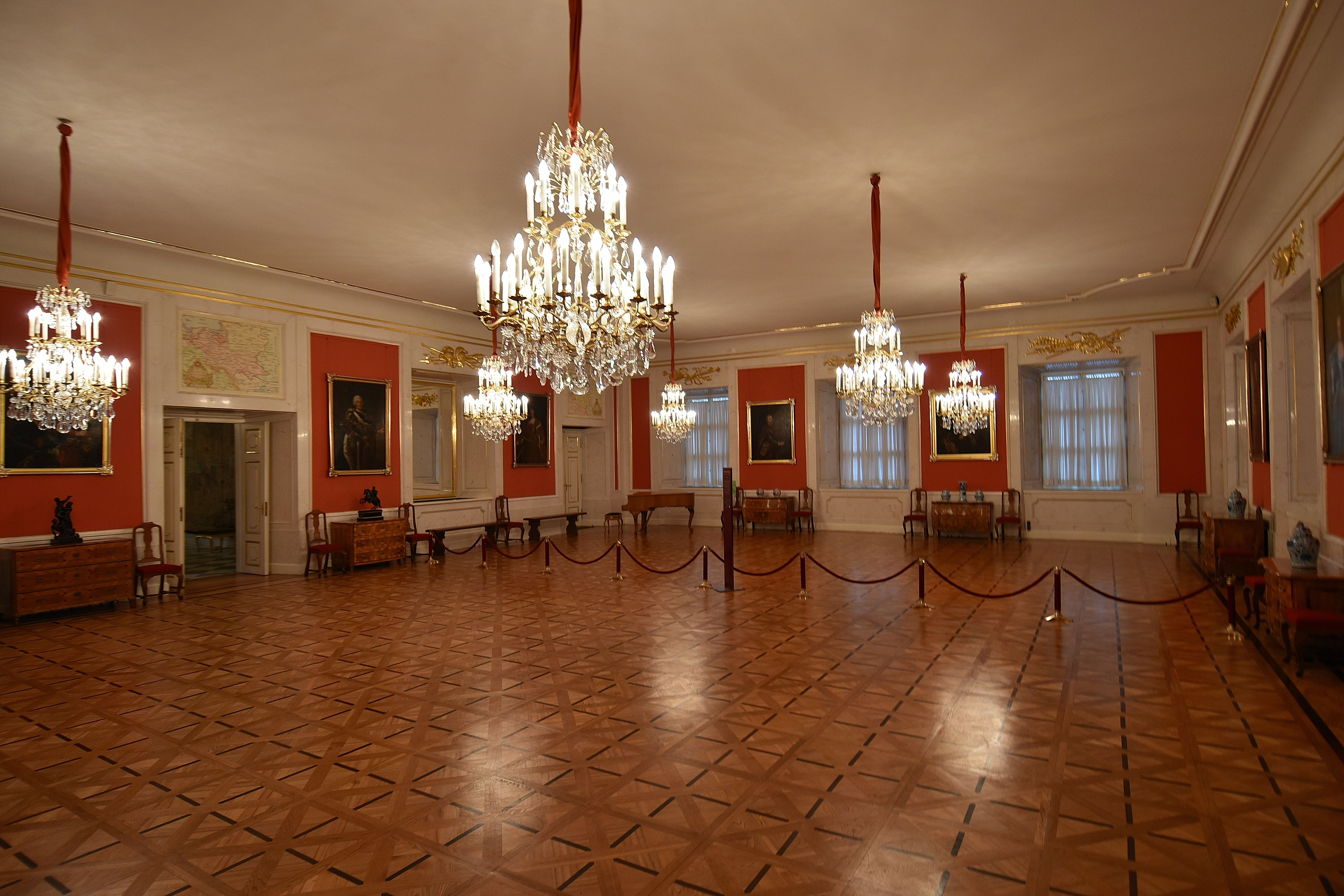
New Chamber of Deputies

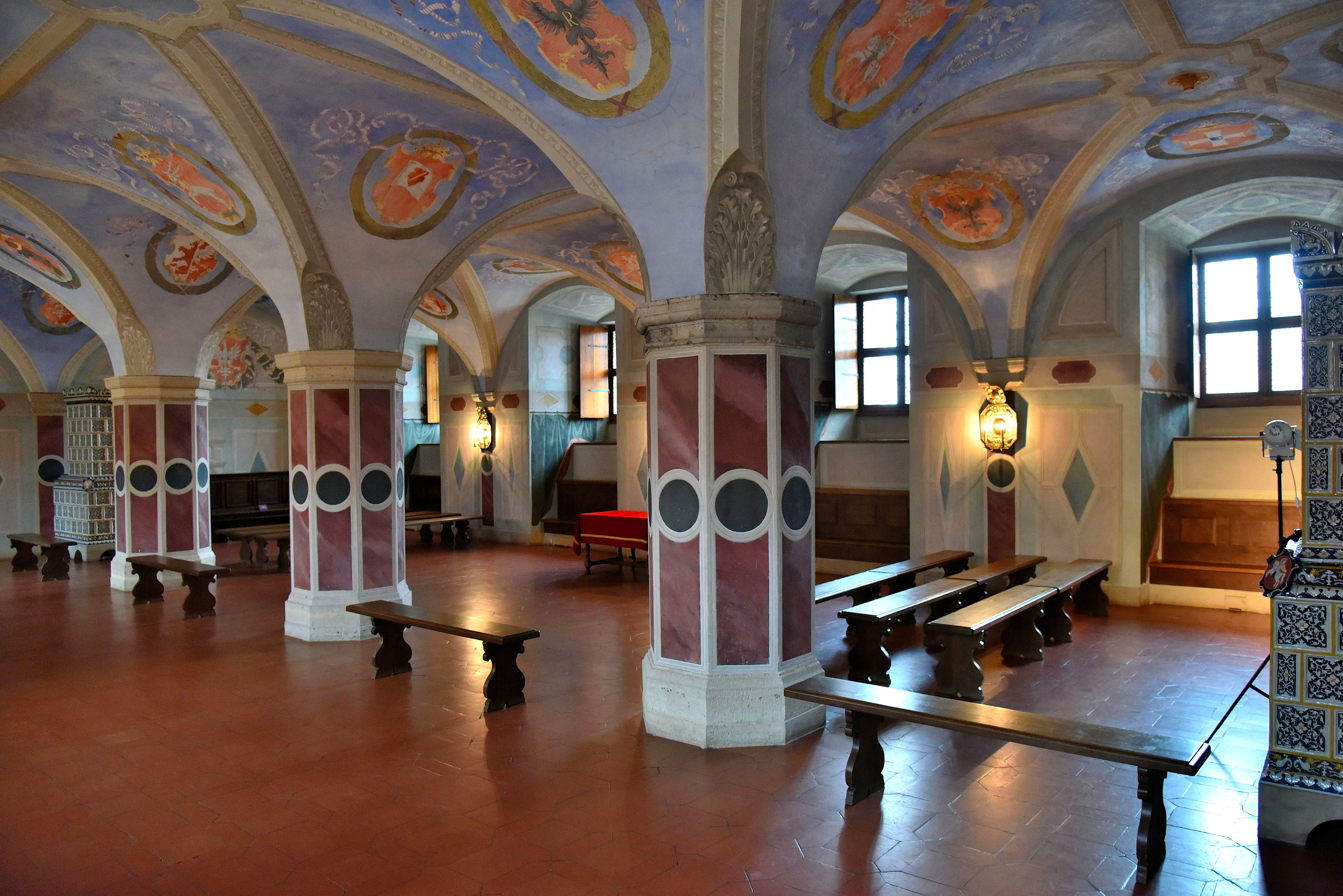
Old Chamber of Deputies

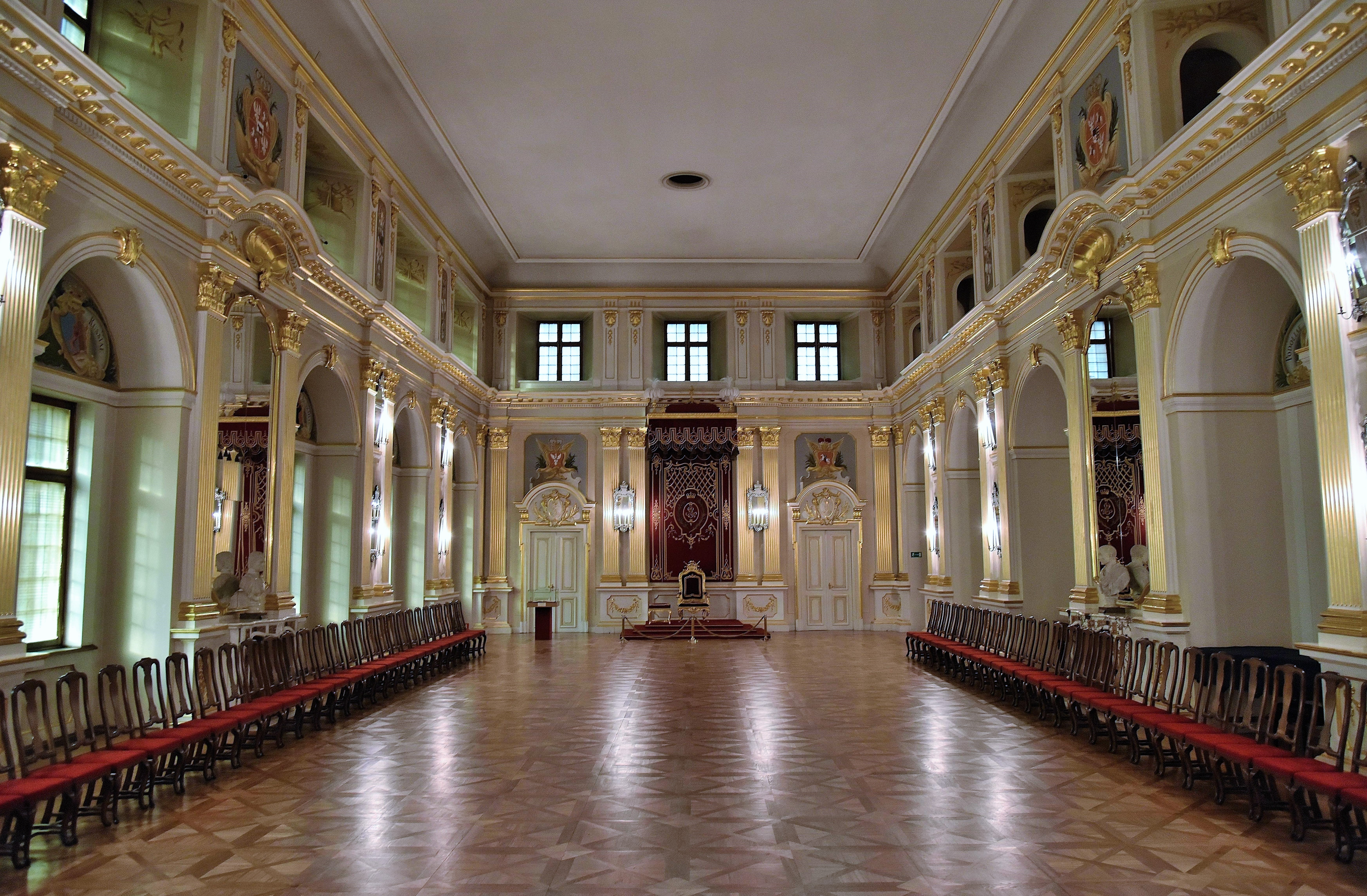
Senatorial Hall

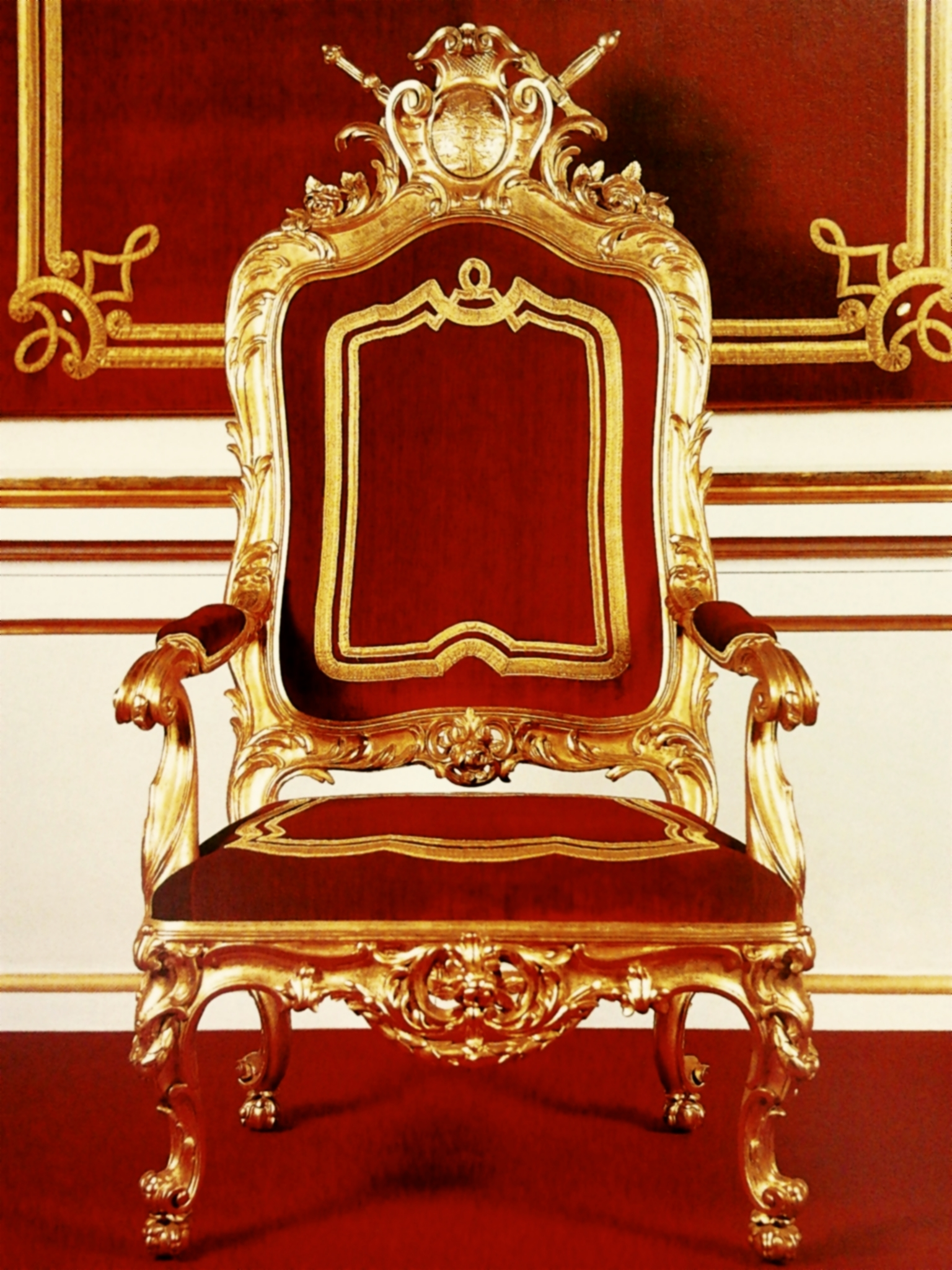
The Throne

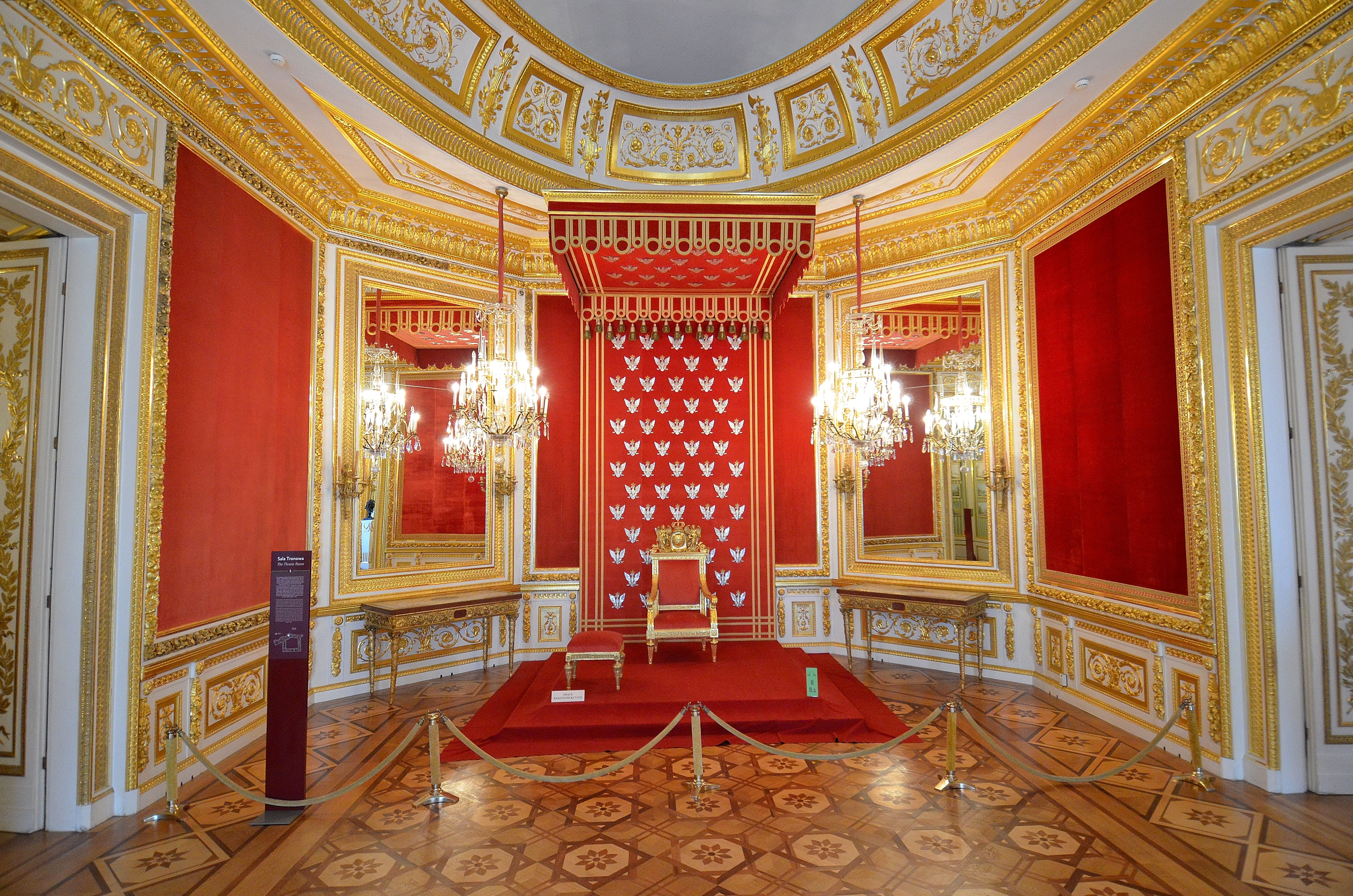
The Throne Room

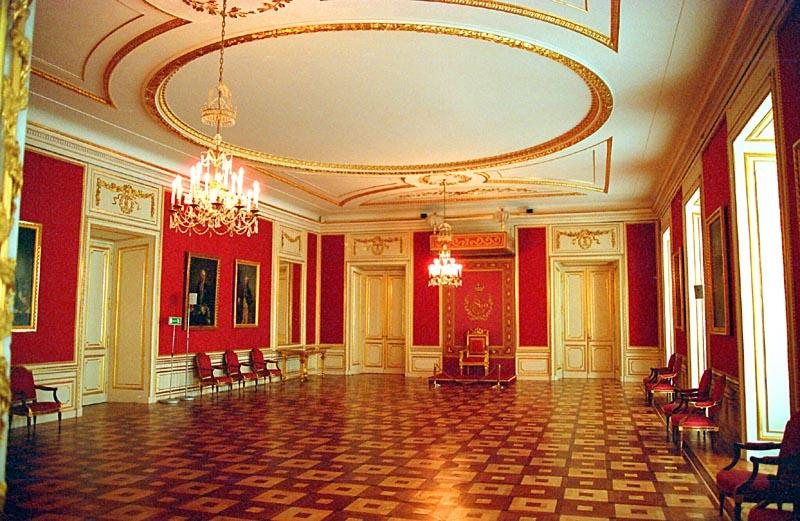
Royal Council Room

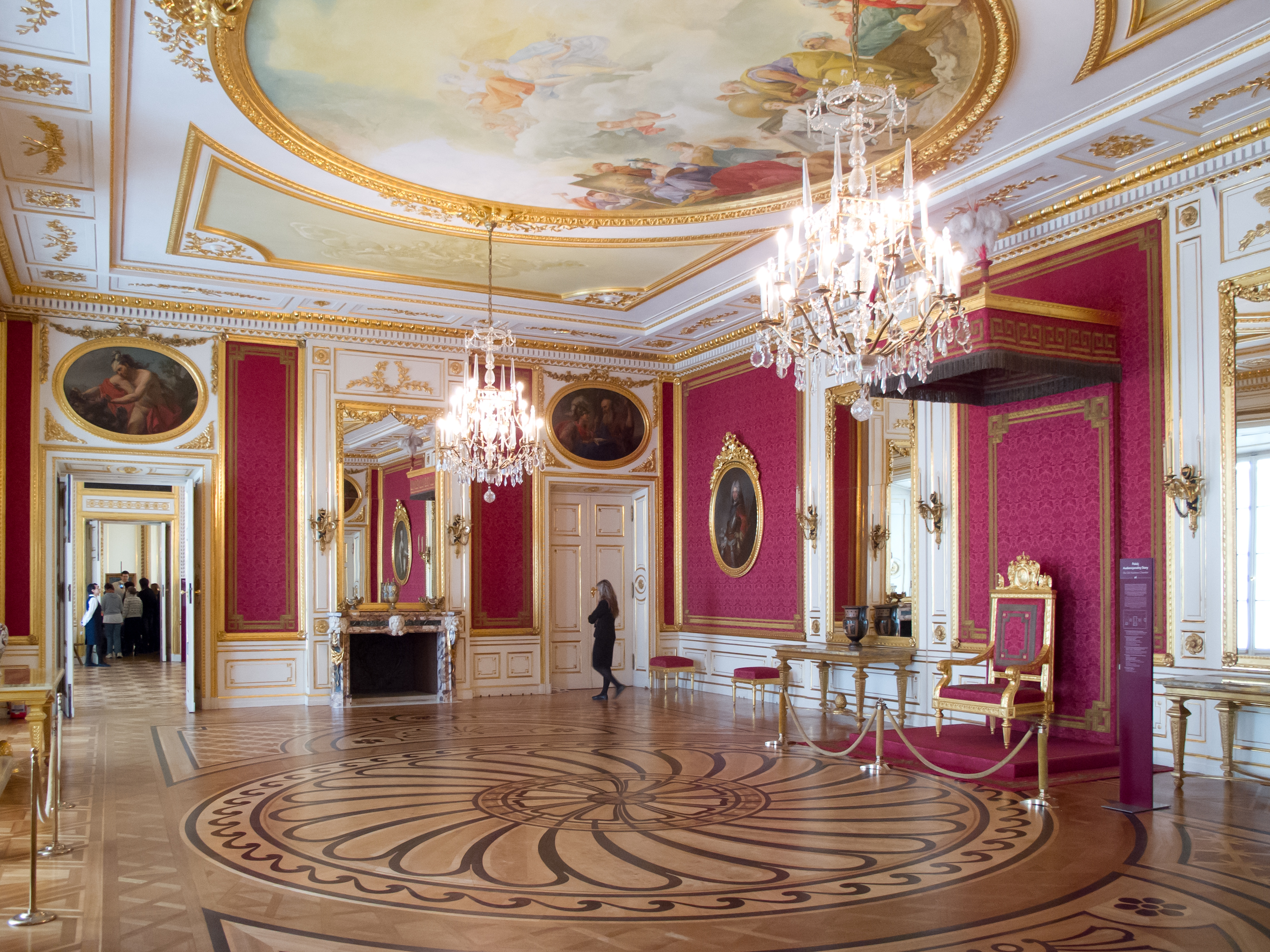
Old Audience Chamber

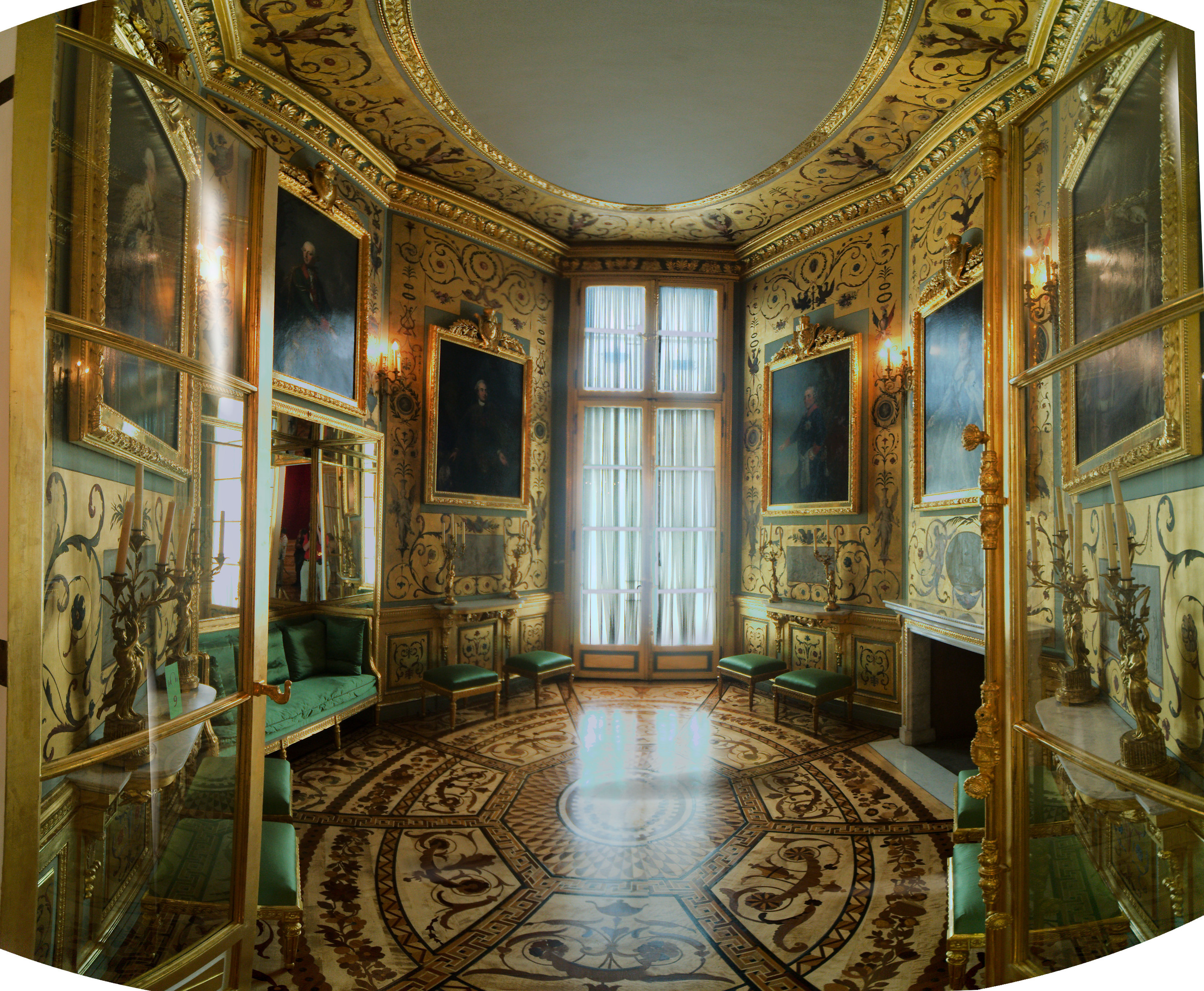
Conference Room

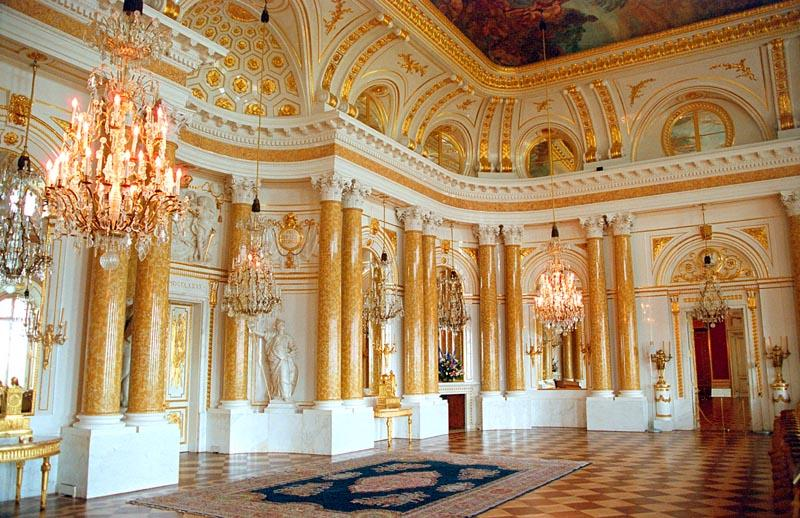
Great Assembly Hall

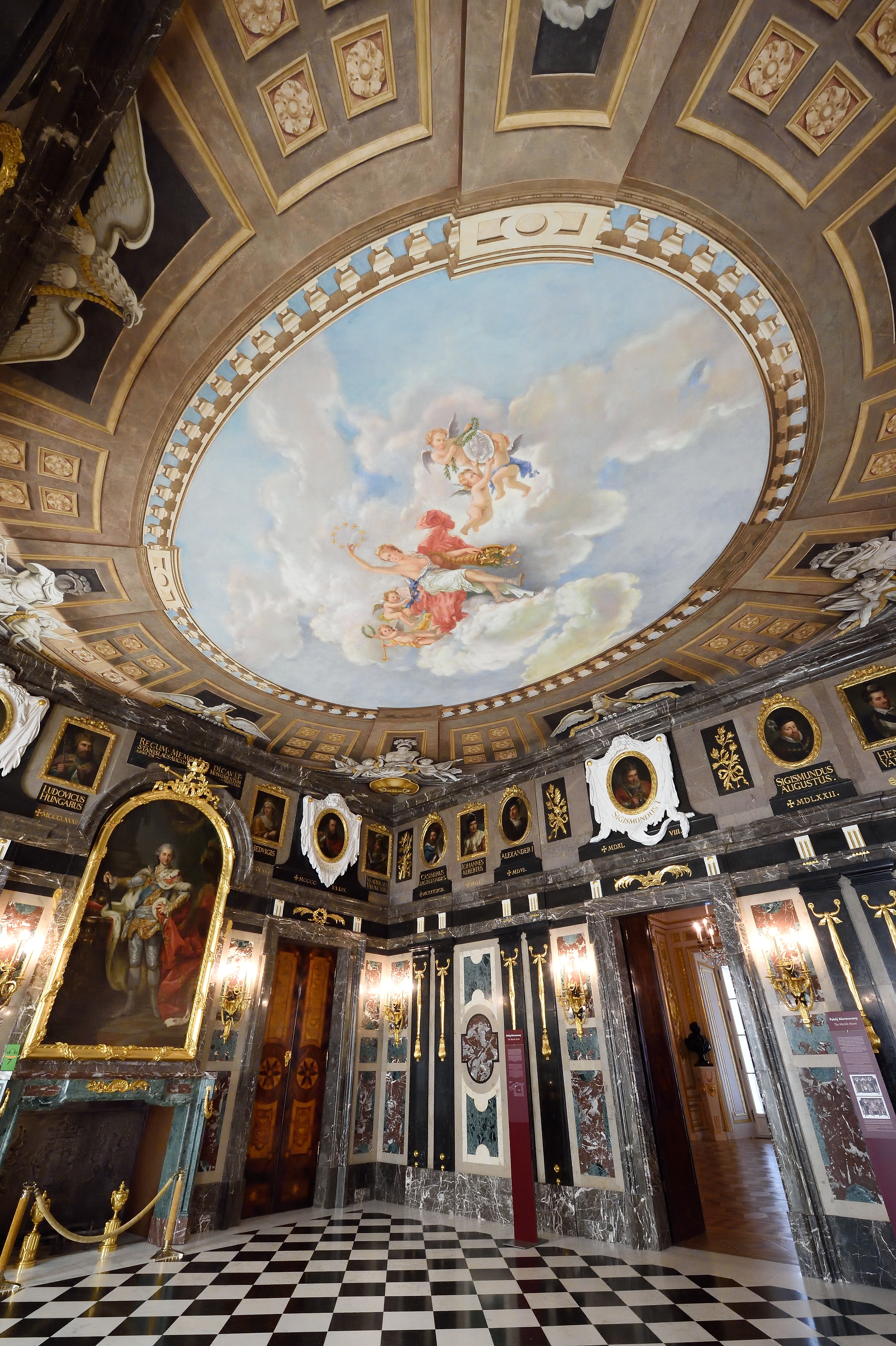
Marble Room

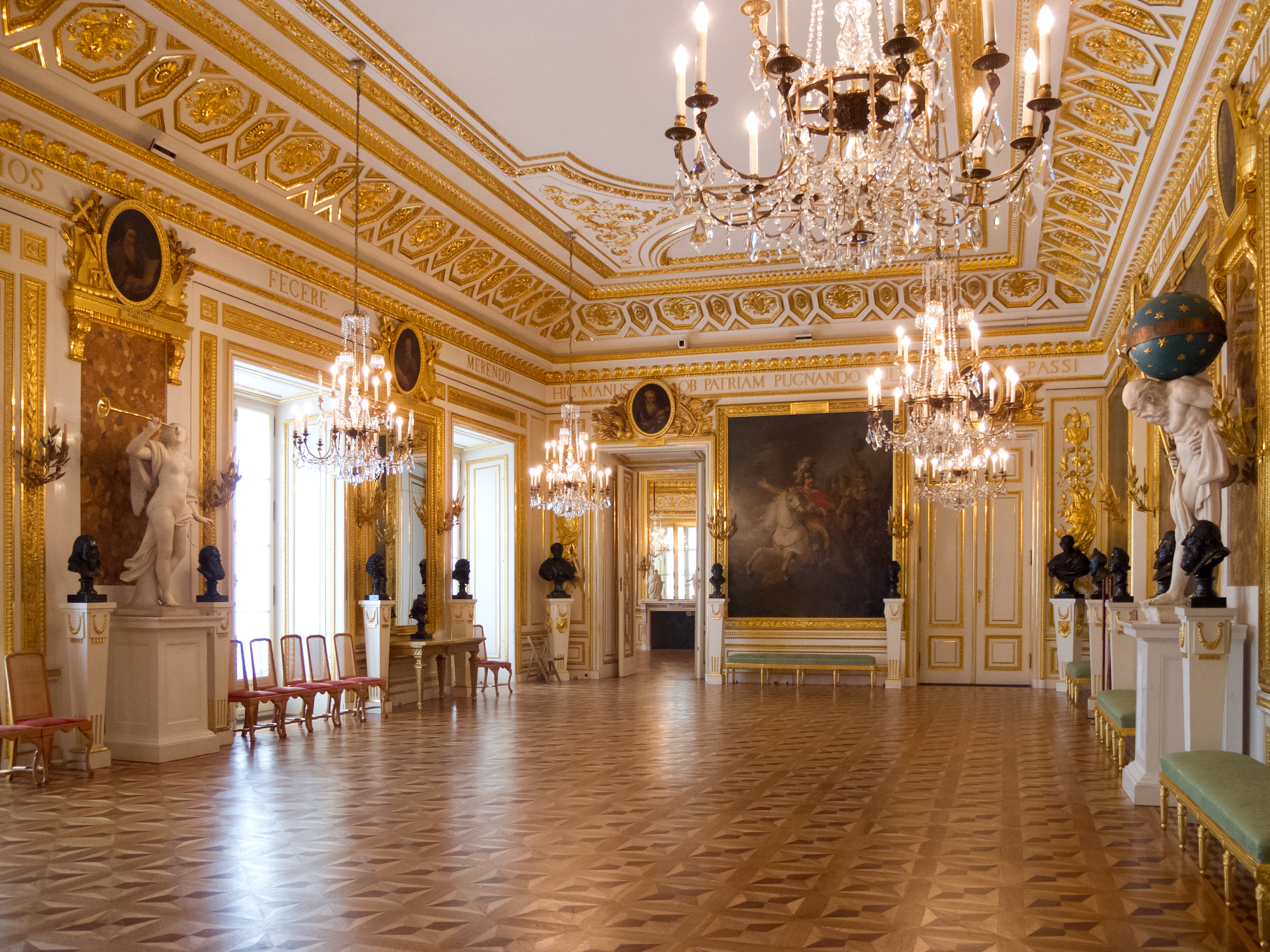
Knight's Room

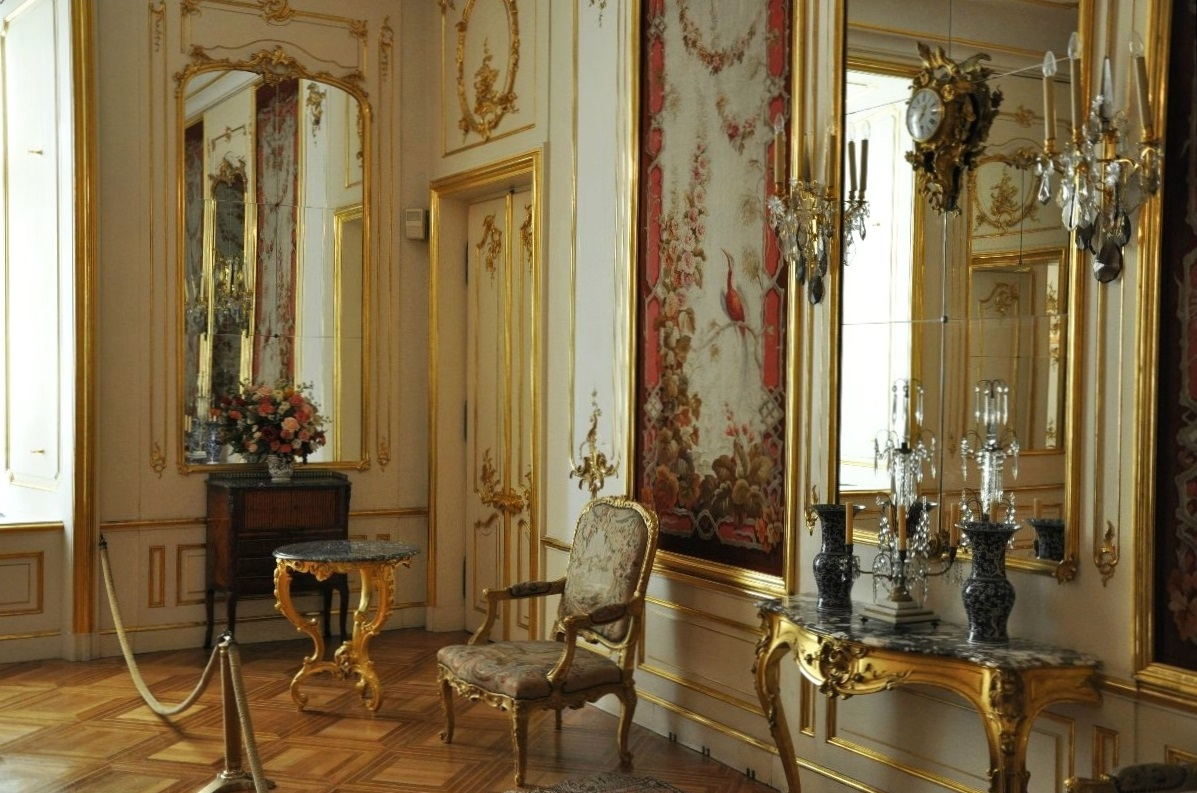
Royal Apartment

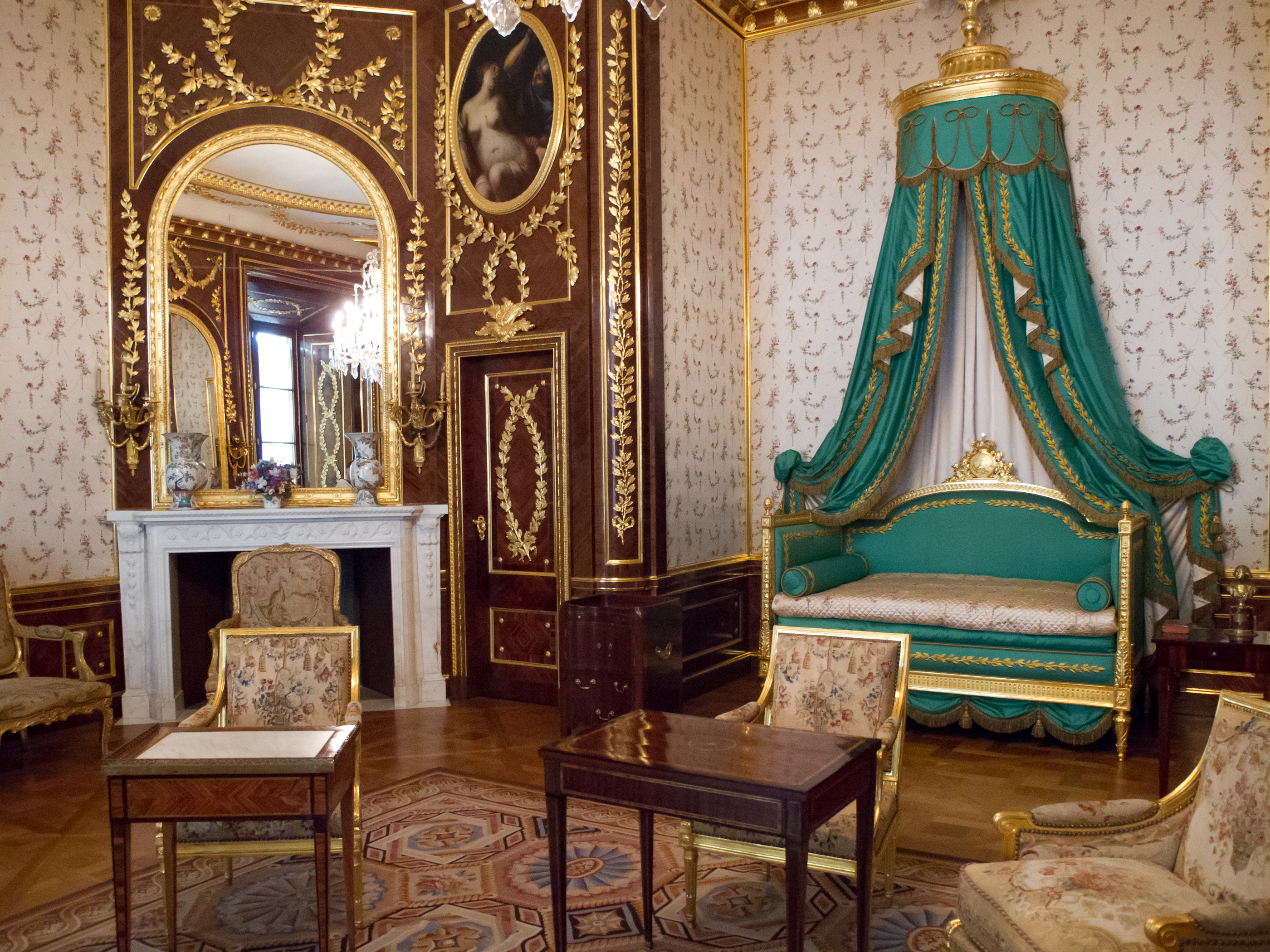
Royal Bedroom

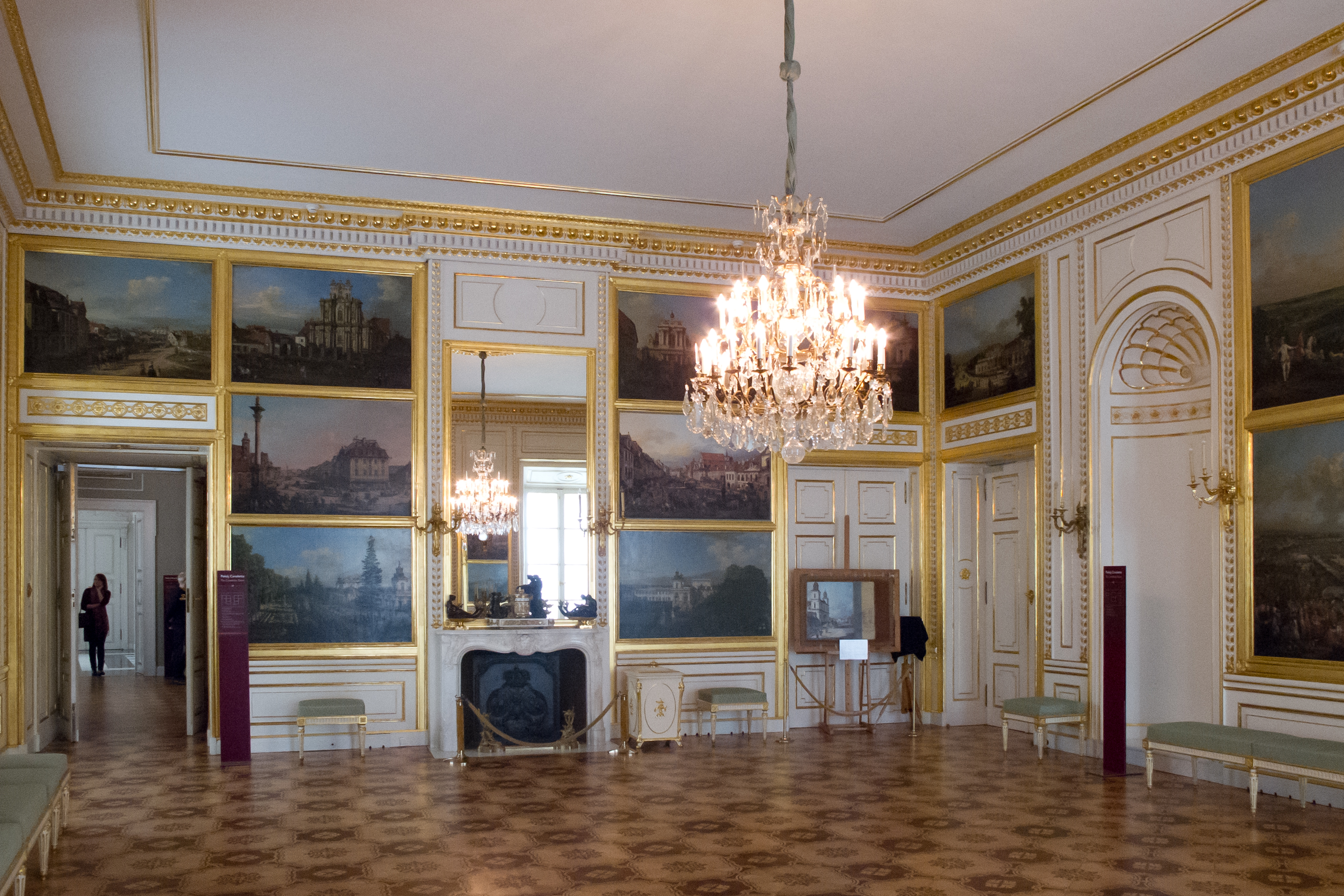
Canaletto Room

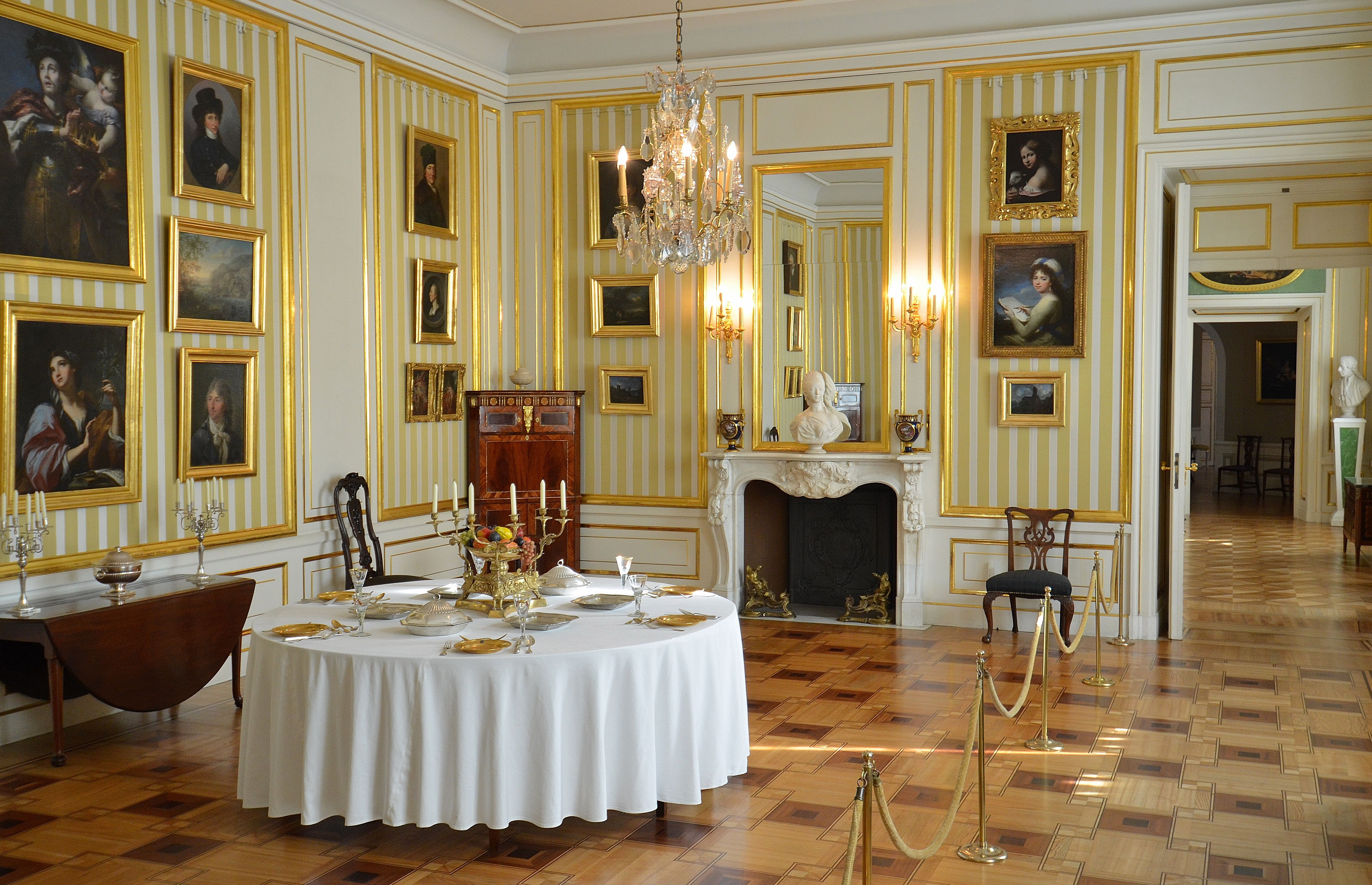
Yellow Room

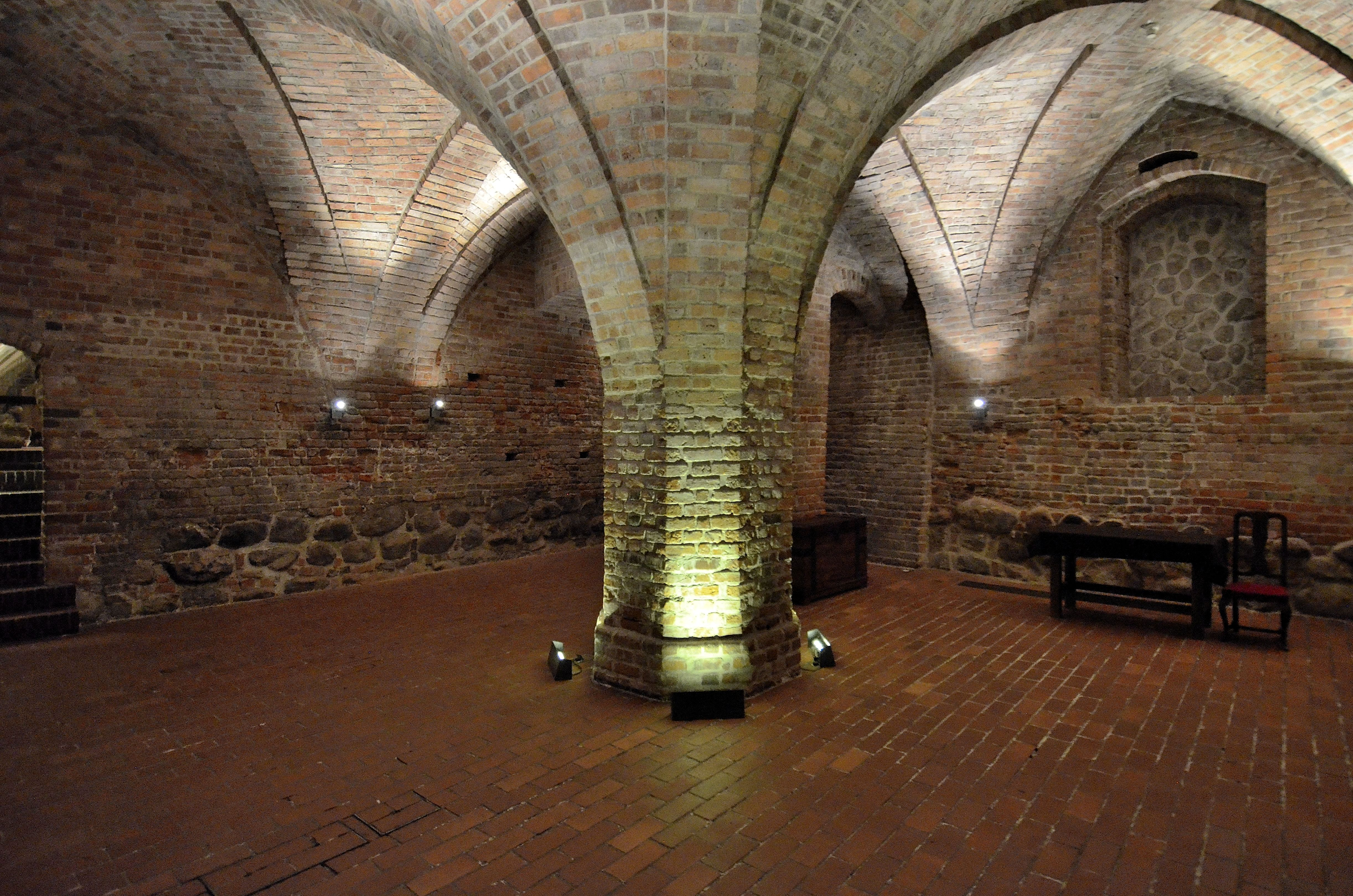
Gothic cellar

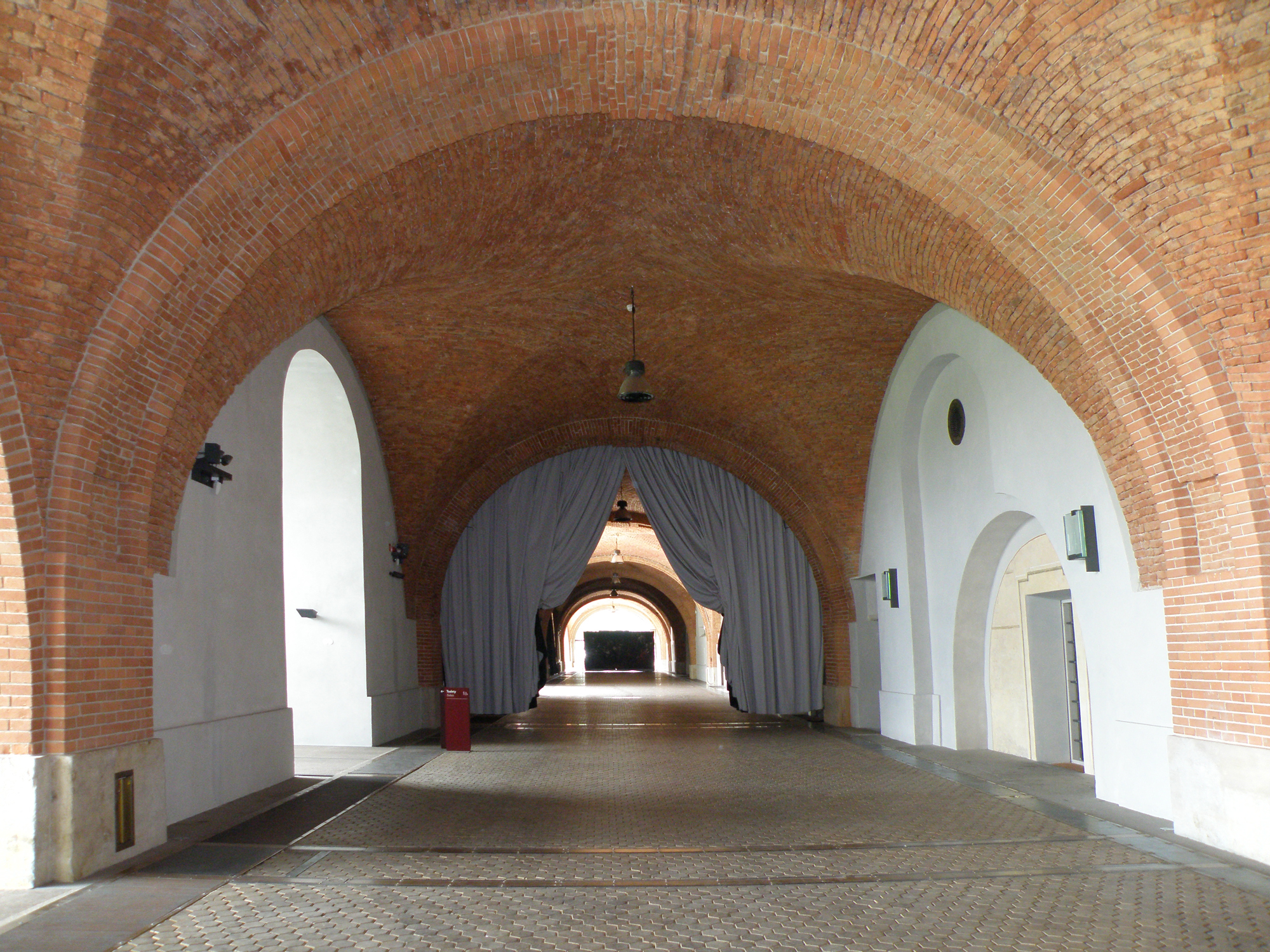
Kubicki Arcade
Artwork

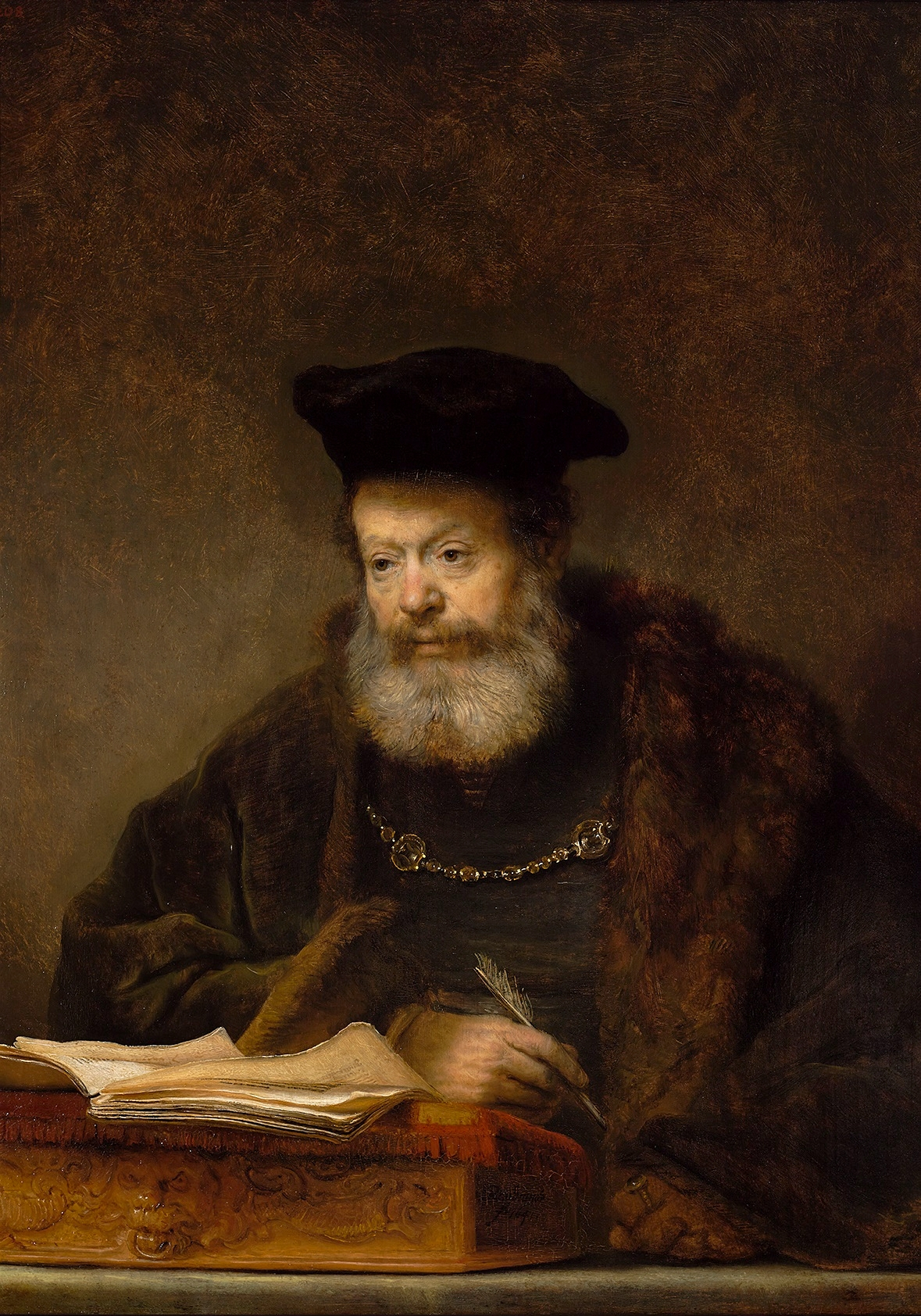
The Scholar at the Lectern, Rembrandt, 1641

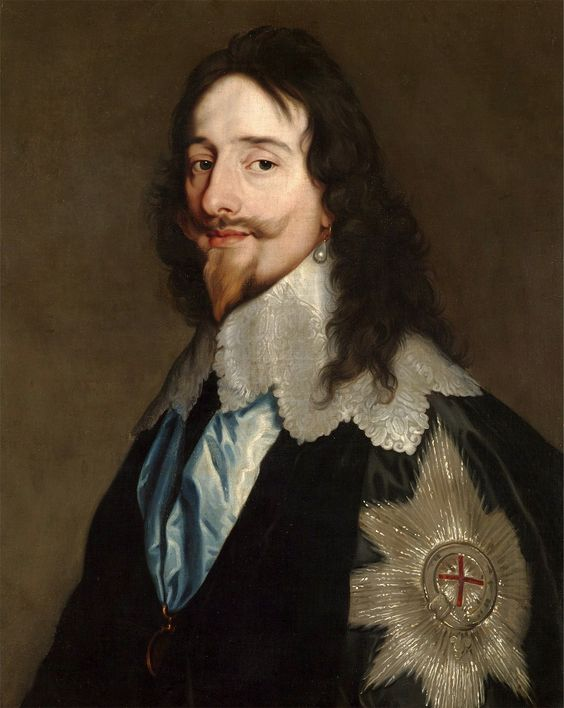
Portrait of Charles I Stuart, Anthony van Dyck, ca.1638

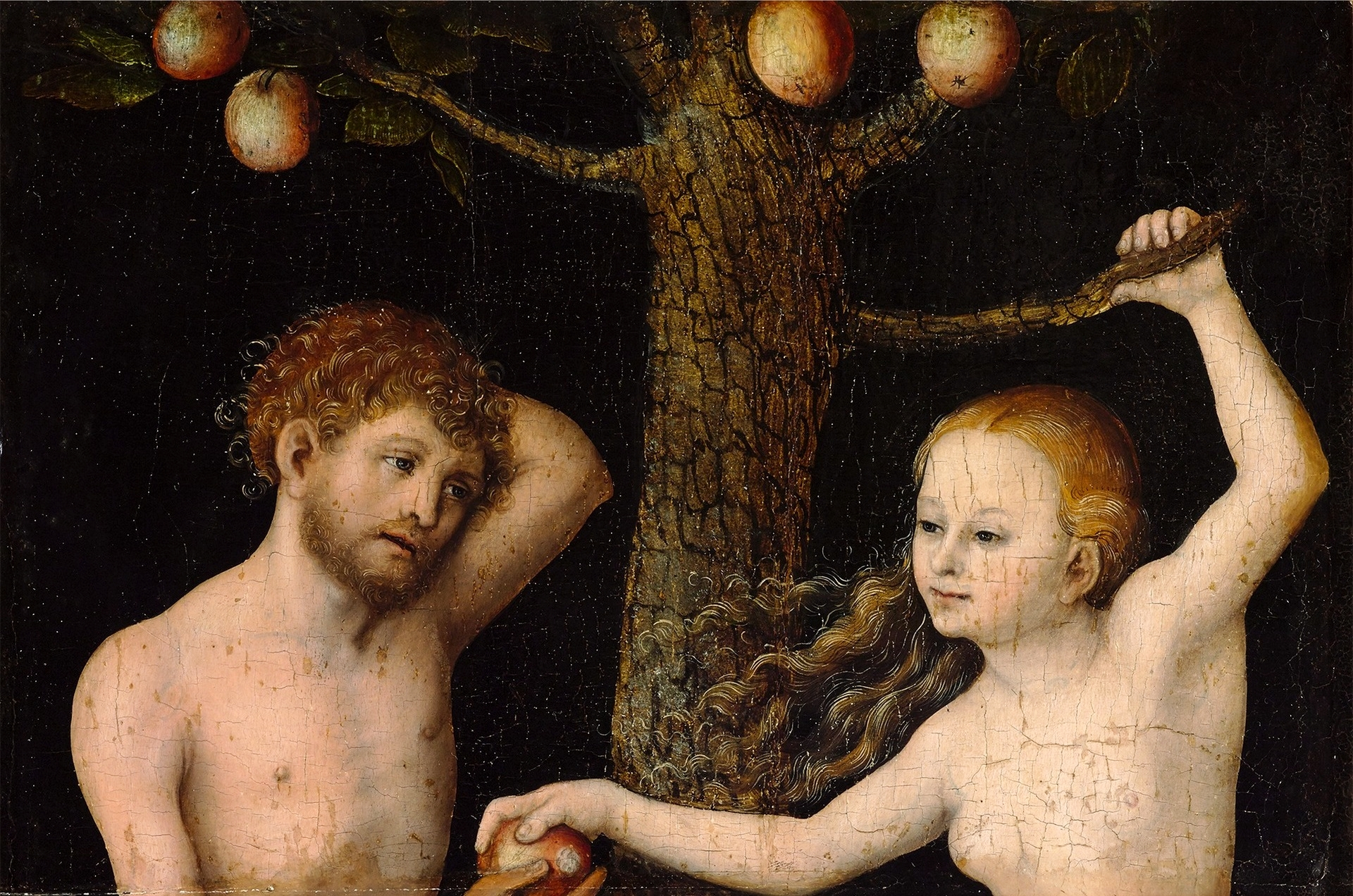
Adam and Eve, Lucas Cranach the Elder, ca. 1528

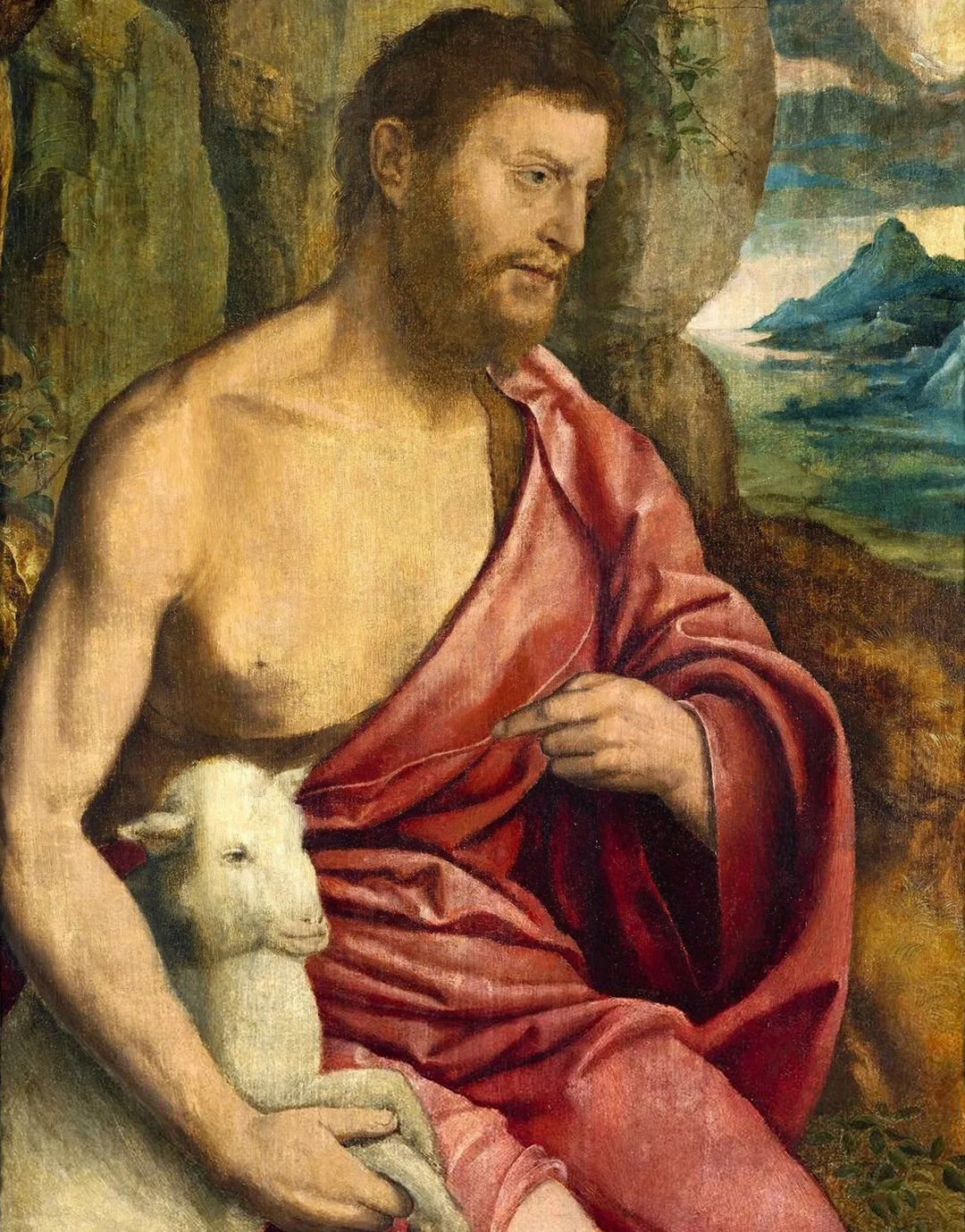
Saint John the Baptist, Joos van Cleve, ca.1540

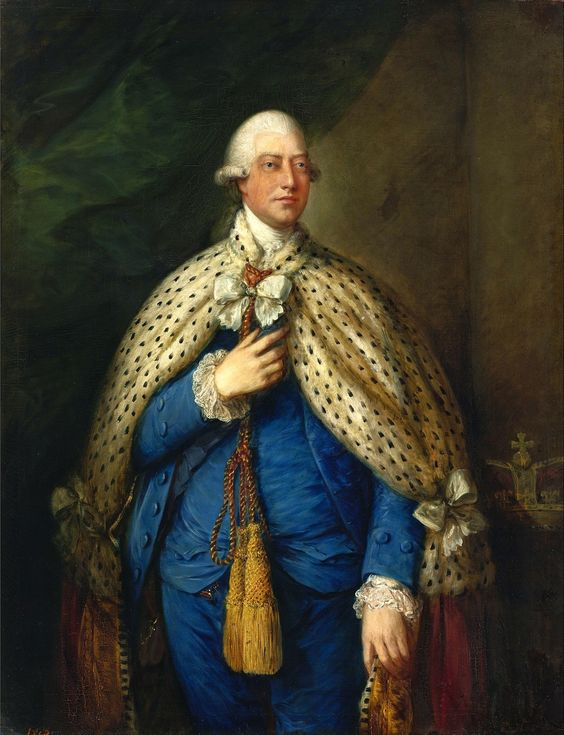
Portrait of George III in Parliament Robes, Thomas Gainsborough, 1785

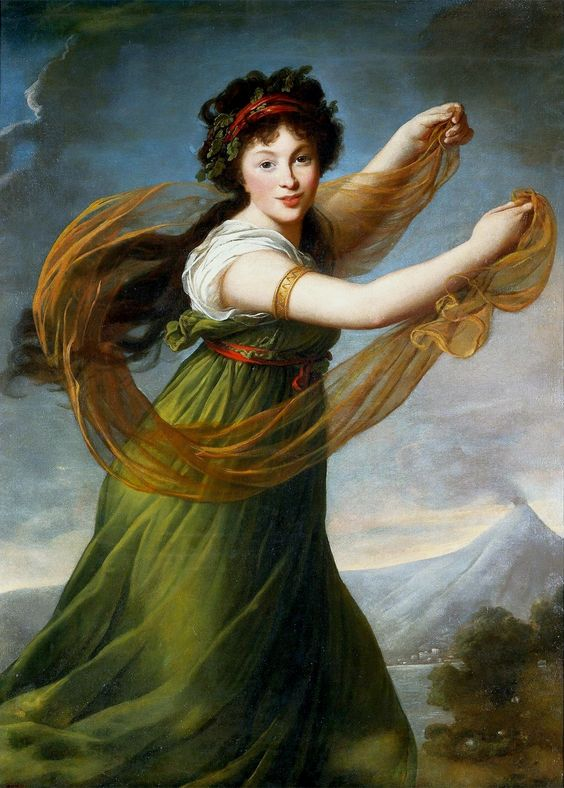
Portrait of Pélagie Sapieżyna-Potocka, Louise Élisabeth Vigée Le Brun, 1794

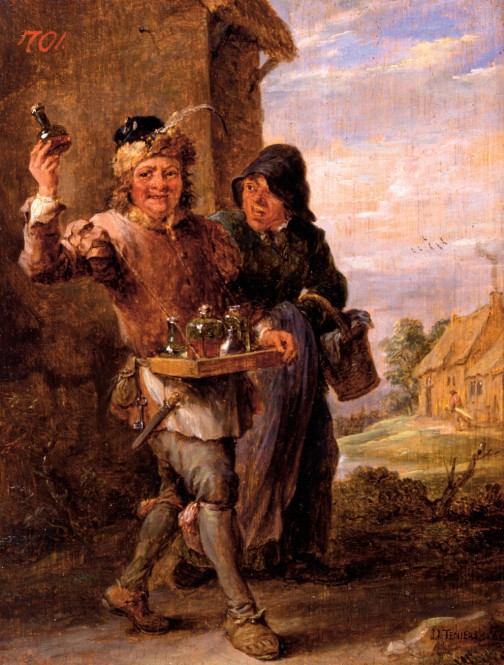
Country Doctor, David Teniers the Younger, second half of 17th century

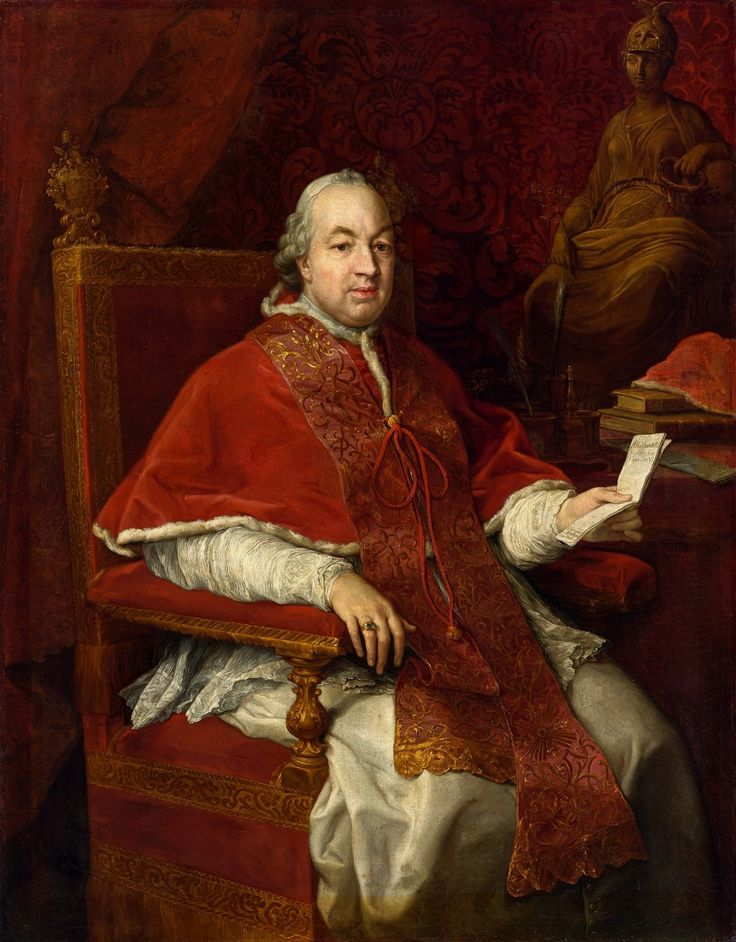
Portrait of Pope Pius VI, Pompeo Batoni, ca.1780

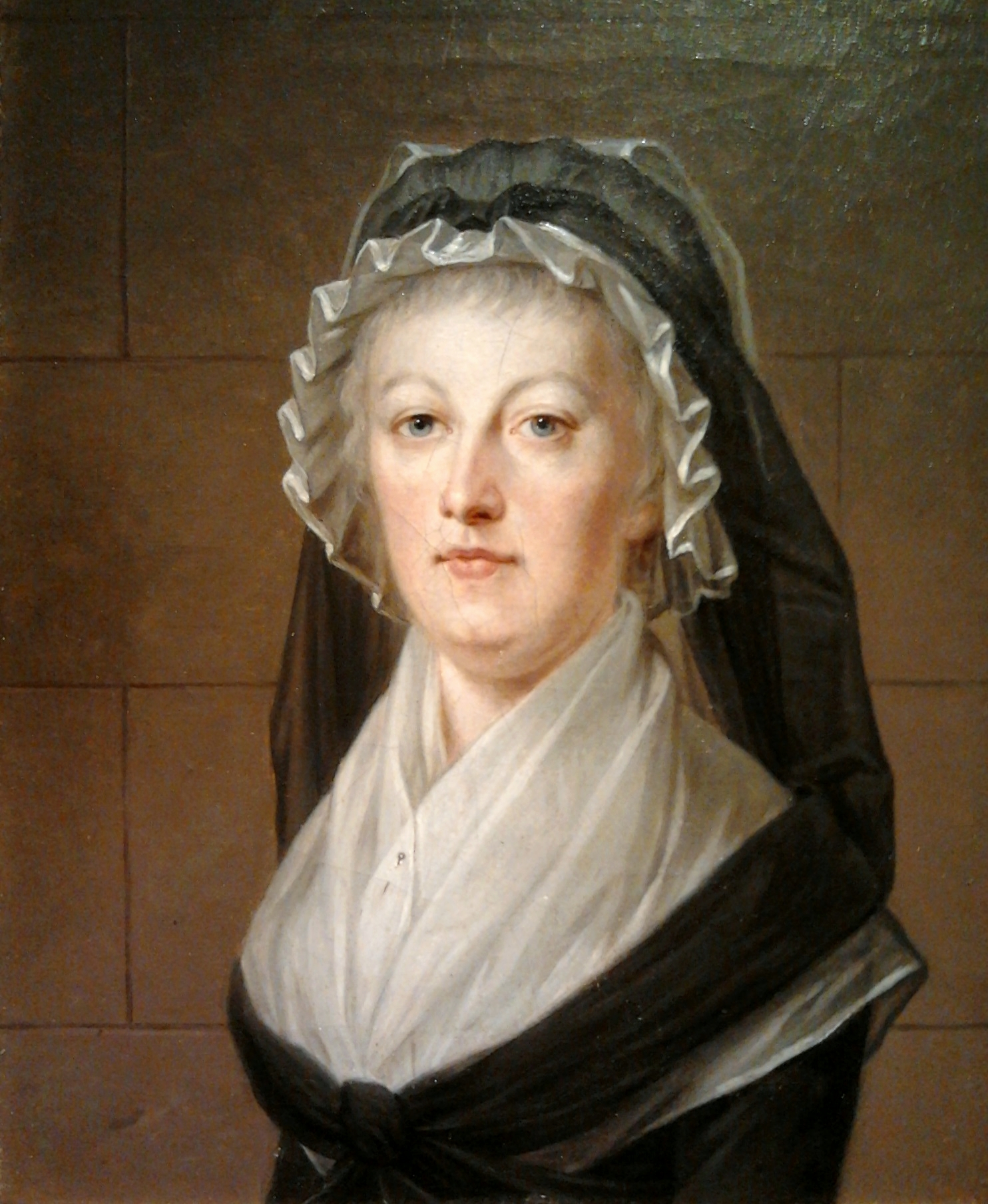
Marie Antoinette in the Temple Prison, Alexander Kucharsky, 1793

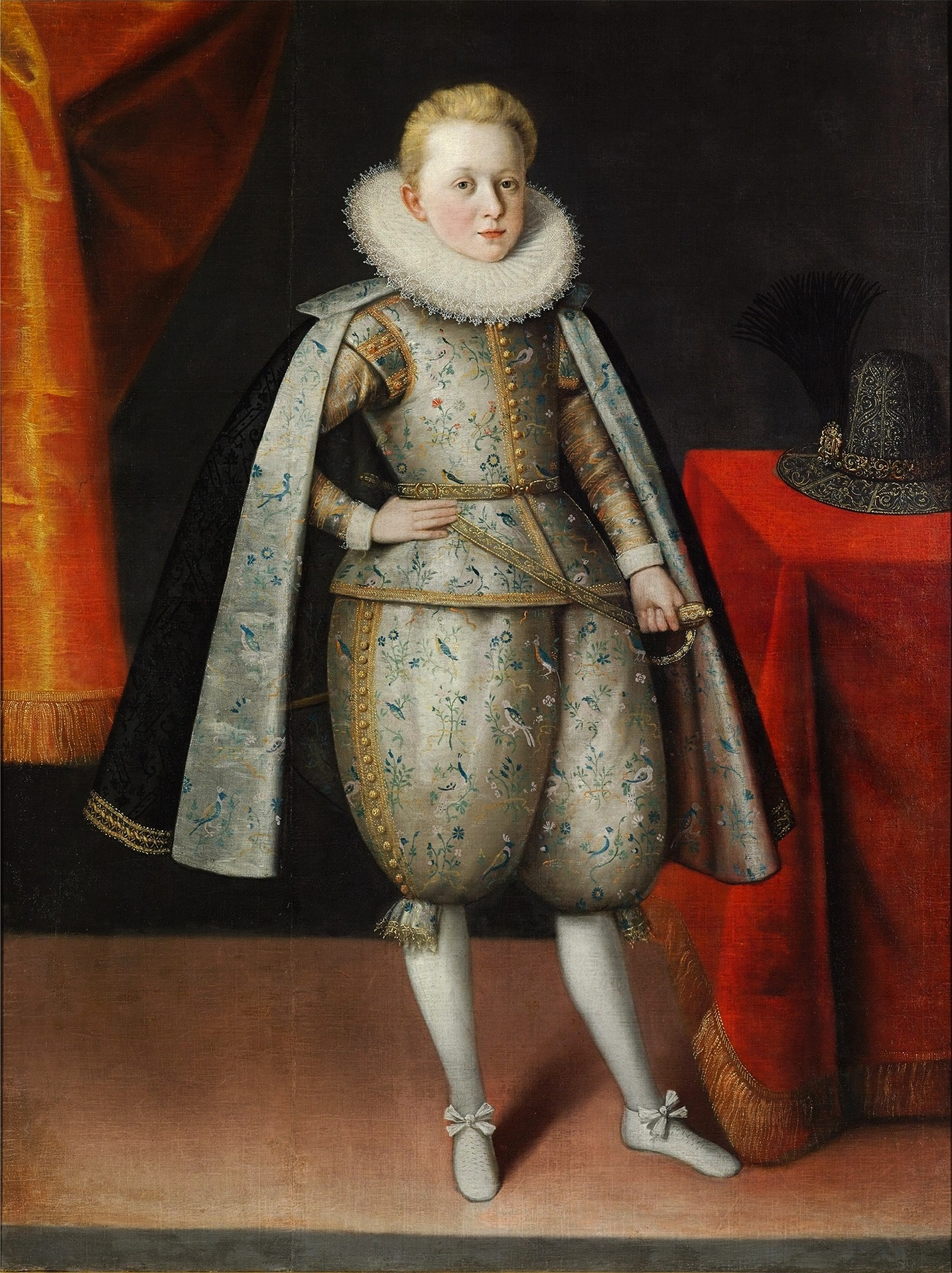
Prince Władysław Vasa, Jakob Troschel, 1605

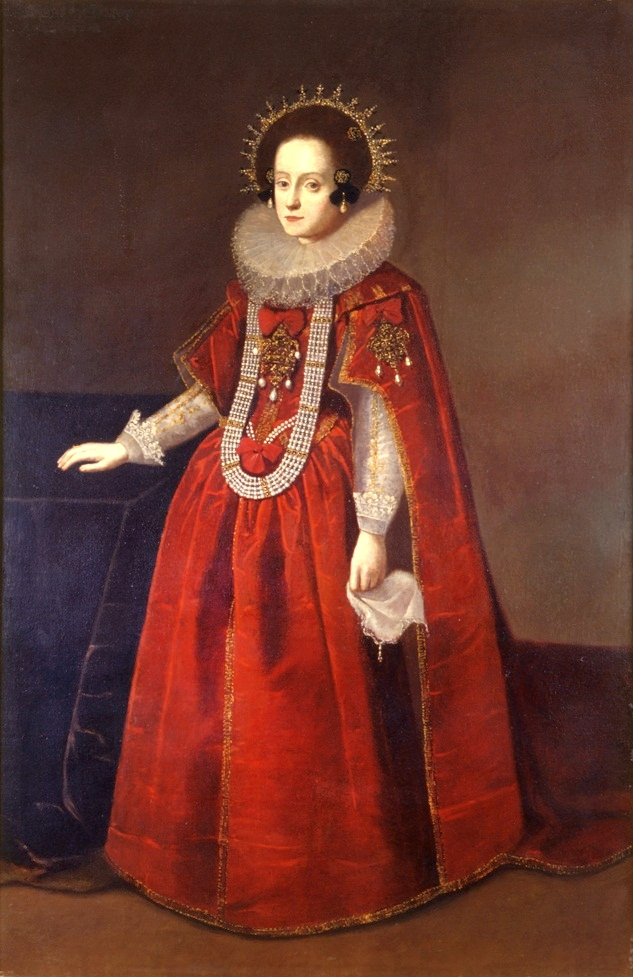
Queen Constance of Austria, Jakob Troschel, 1624

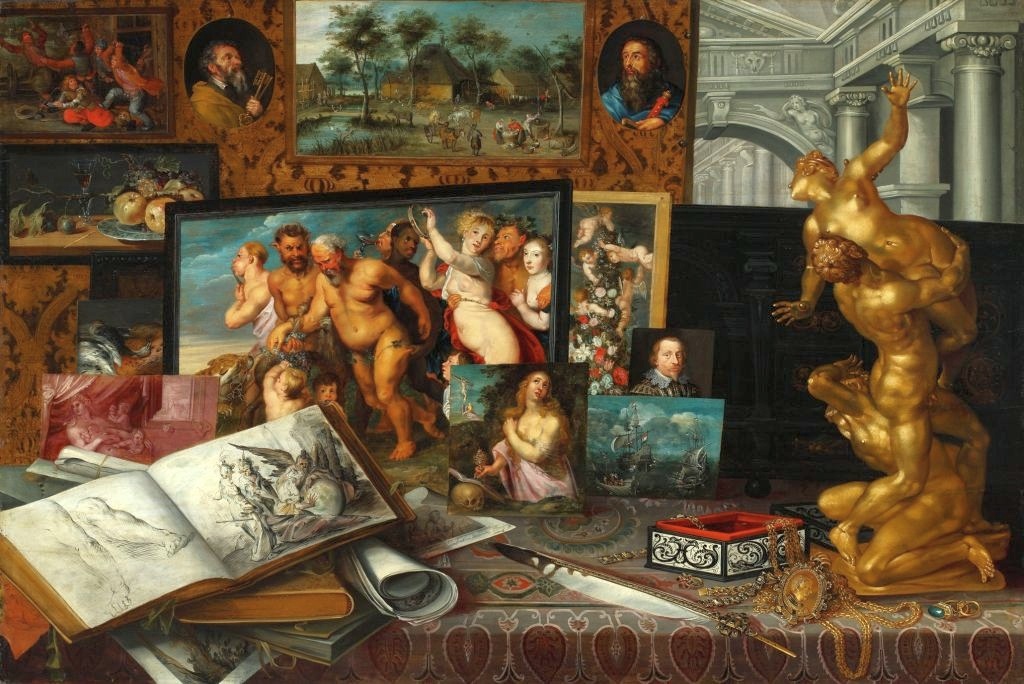
Art Cabinet of Prince Władysław Vasa, Etienne de la Hire, 1626

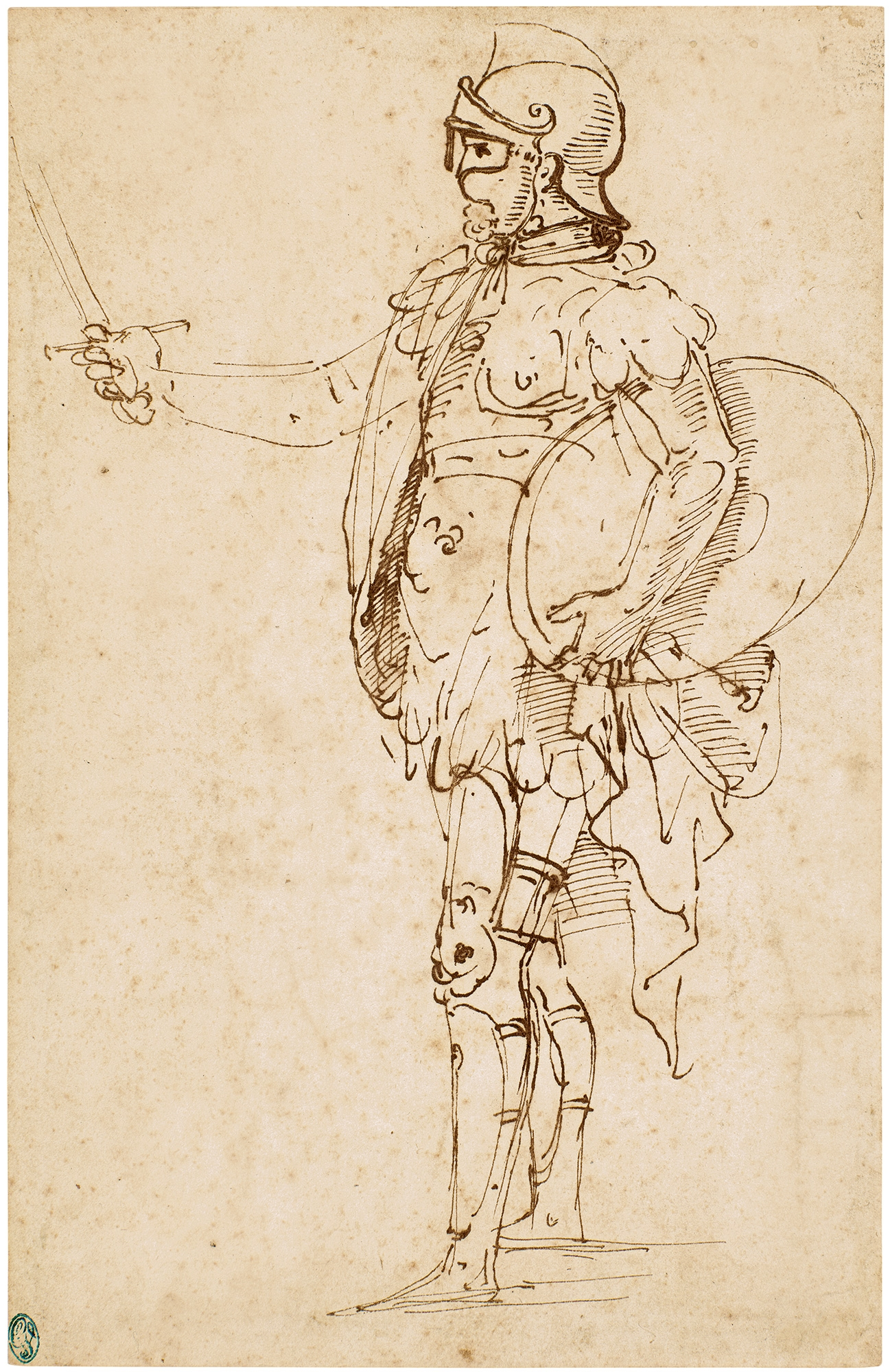
A Standing Soldier in Armor Seen in Profile by Raphael, c. 1500

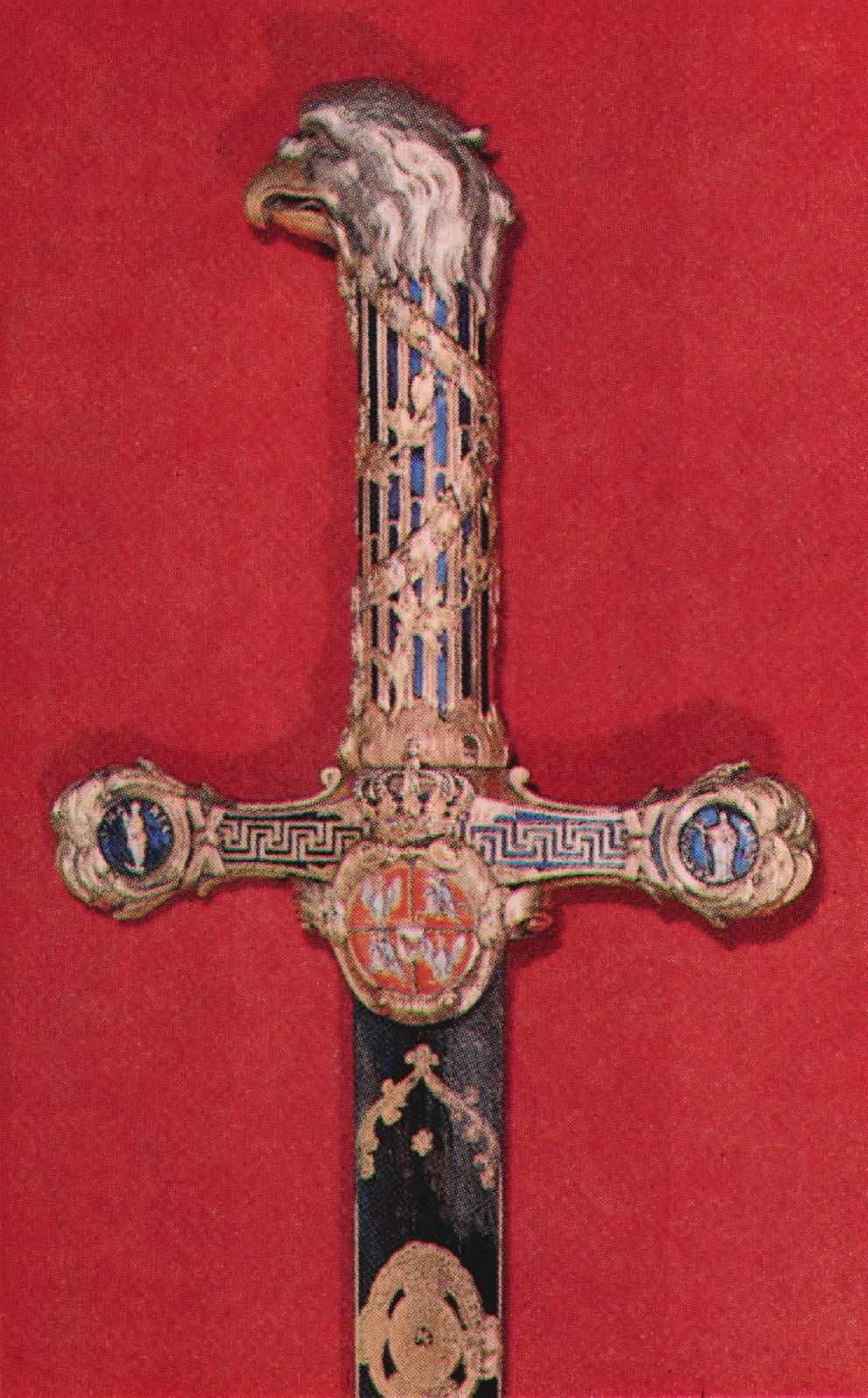
Ceremonial sword of the Saint Stanislaw's Order, 1764

== Copper-Roof Palace ==
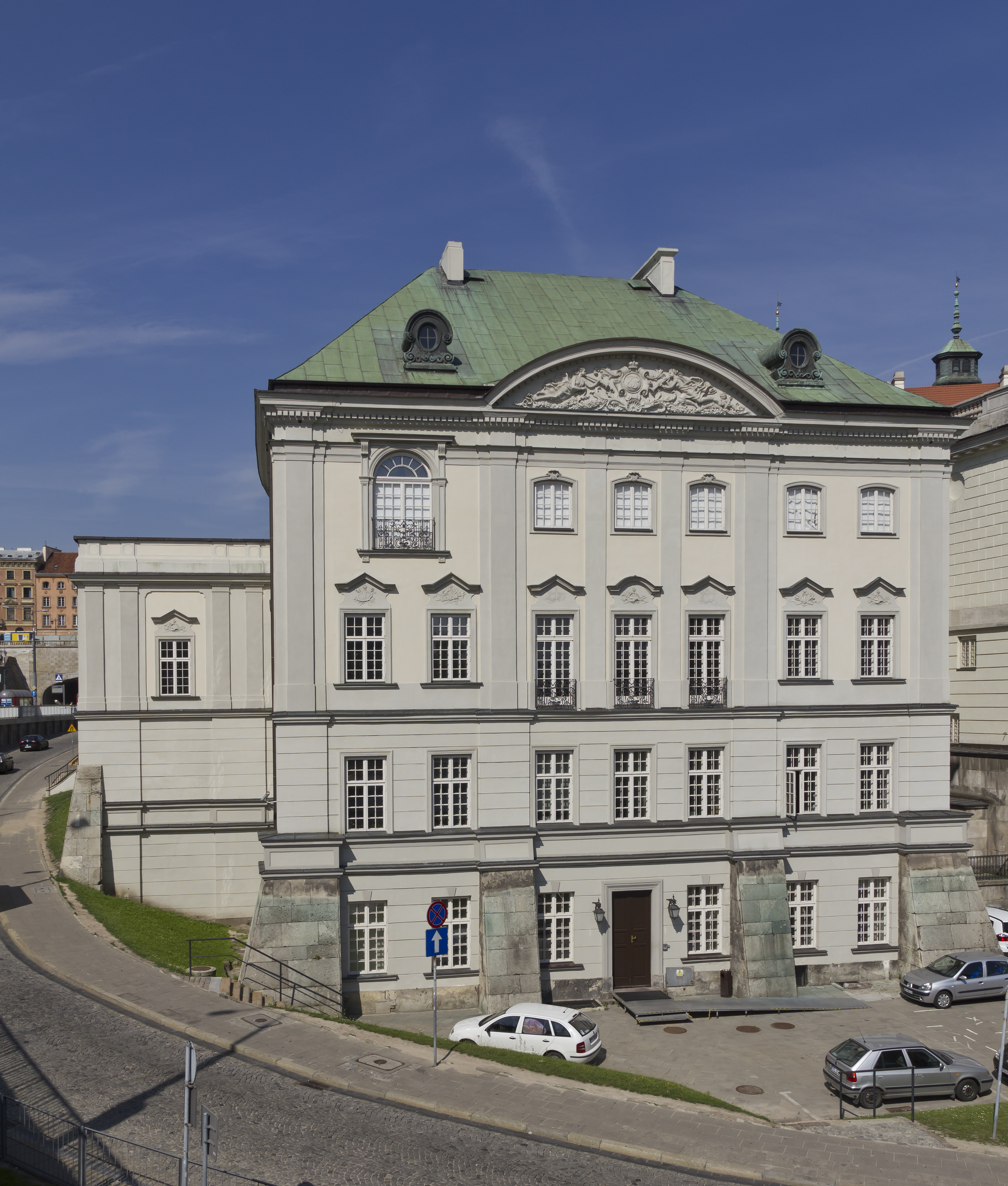
Copper-Roof Palace adjacent to the castle.

The Copper-Roof Palace has since 1989 been a branch of the Royal Castle Museum. The palace is contiguous with Warsaw's Royal Castle, and down a slope from the Castle Square and Old Town. It was originally a patrician house of Wawrzyniec Reffus, it was built 1651–1656. After the 1657 destruction by the army of George II Rákóczi, it was completely remodeled in 1698–1701 for Jerzy Dominik Lubomirski.

Lubomirski expanded the palace by building a southern wing, perpendicular to the rest of structure, and also expanded the western elevation. Shortly after its construction the palace became known as Palais Martin, after Lubomirski's grandson. In 1720, the palace was rebuilt with an addition of a second northern wing. Additionally the interior was decorated with rococo paintings. After 1777, the palace passed into ownership of Poland's last king, Stanisław II Augustus, who hired the architect Domenico Merlini to once again redesign the inside rooms of the palace and join the library wing of the Royal Castle to it. The King then made a present of the redecorated place to his nephew Prince Józef Poniatowski The younger Poniatowski was a successful commander in the 1794 Kościuszko Uprising, and later one of Napoleon Bonaparte's marshala. Under his ownership the palace became a center of Warsaw's high class social scene. When Warsaw became part of Kingdom of Prussia after the Third Partition of Poland the buildings became the headquarters for the Prussian Ministry of War.

The Copper-Roof Palace was burned in 1944 and reconstructed, based on paintings of Bernardo Bellotto, between 1948 and 1949.

Currently the palace is a museum hosting, inter alia, a permanent exhibition of oriental carpets and other oriental decorative art, donated to the museum by Mrs. Teresa Sahakian. The collection comprises 579 items, 562 of which are textiles.

== Interesting facts ==
Varsovian trumpet call played from one of the towers of the Royal Castle.

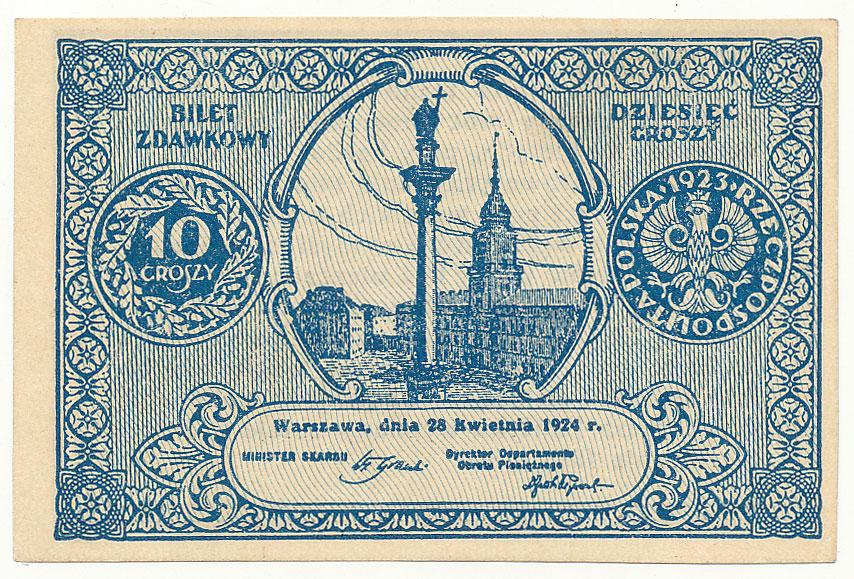
Polish 10 groszy banknote from 1924

- On 24 May 1829, in the Royal Castle's Senator's Hall, Nicholas I of Russia was crowned King of Poland.
- On 5 November 1916, the Act of 5 November was announced in the Grand Hall.
- On 23 April 1935, the April Constitution was signed in the Knight Hall.
- Stanisław Augustus Poniatowski's regalia are kept in the Royal Chapel. These are the Order of the White Eagle, the ceremonial sword of the Saint Stanisław's Order and aquamarine sceptre.
- The insignia of presidential power are also stored in the Castle- the stamp of the President, the Jack of the President of the Republic of Poland and national documents, which Ryszard Kaczorowski gave to Lech Wałęsa on 22 December 1990.
- Many of the Polish legends are connected with the Royal Castle. According to one of them in 1569 the King Sigismund Augustus, who was in mourning after death of his beloved wife Barbara Radziwiłł, asked the renowned sorcerer Master Twardowski to evoke her ghost. The experiment was successful with support of a magic mirror, which today is kept in the Węgrów Cathedral. Despite that some people suspected that it was not the Queen's ghost but closely resembling her king's mistress Barbara Giżanka and the whole event was set up by Giżanka's accomplice Mikołaj Mniszech, king's chamberlain.
- The Royal Castle in Warsaw is one of the official members of the Association of the Royal Residences of Europe.
- In 2014, the National Bank of Poland issued a 5 zloty coin in a series called "Discover Poland" depicting the Royal Castle in Warsaw.

== Chicago replica ==
In 1979, the historic Gateway Theatre in the Jefferson Park community area of Chicago was purchased by the Copernicus Foundation with the intention of converting it into the seat of the Polish Cultural and Civic Center. Because of the building's historical significance, its interior was kept intact while the exterior was remodelled and a Neo-Baroque clock tower was added to give it the resemblance of the Royal Castle in Warsaw. It is a visual tribute to Chicago's large Polish populace, the largest such presence outside of Poland.

== See also ==
- Castle Square
- St. John's Archcathedral, Warsaw
- Sigismund's Column
- List of castles in Poland
- List of palaces in Poland

== Bibliography ==
1. Lileyko Jerzy (1980). Vademecum Zamku Warszawskiego (in Polish). Warsaw. ISBN 83-223-1818-9.
2. Stefan Kieniewicz, ed. (1984). Warszawa w latach 1526–1795 (Warsaw in 1526–1795) (in Polish). Warsaw. ISBN 83-01-03323-1.
