= History of the Royal Castle, Warsaw =

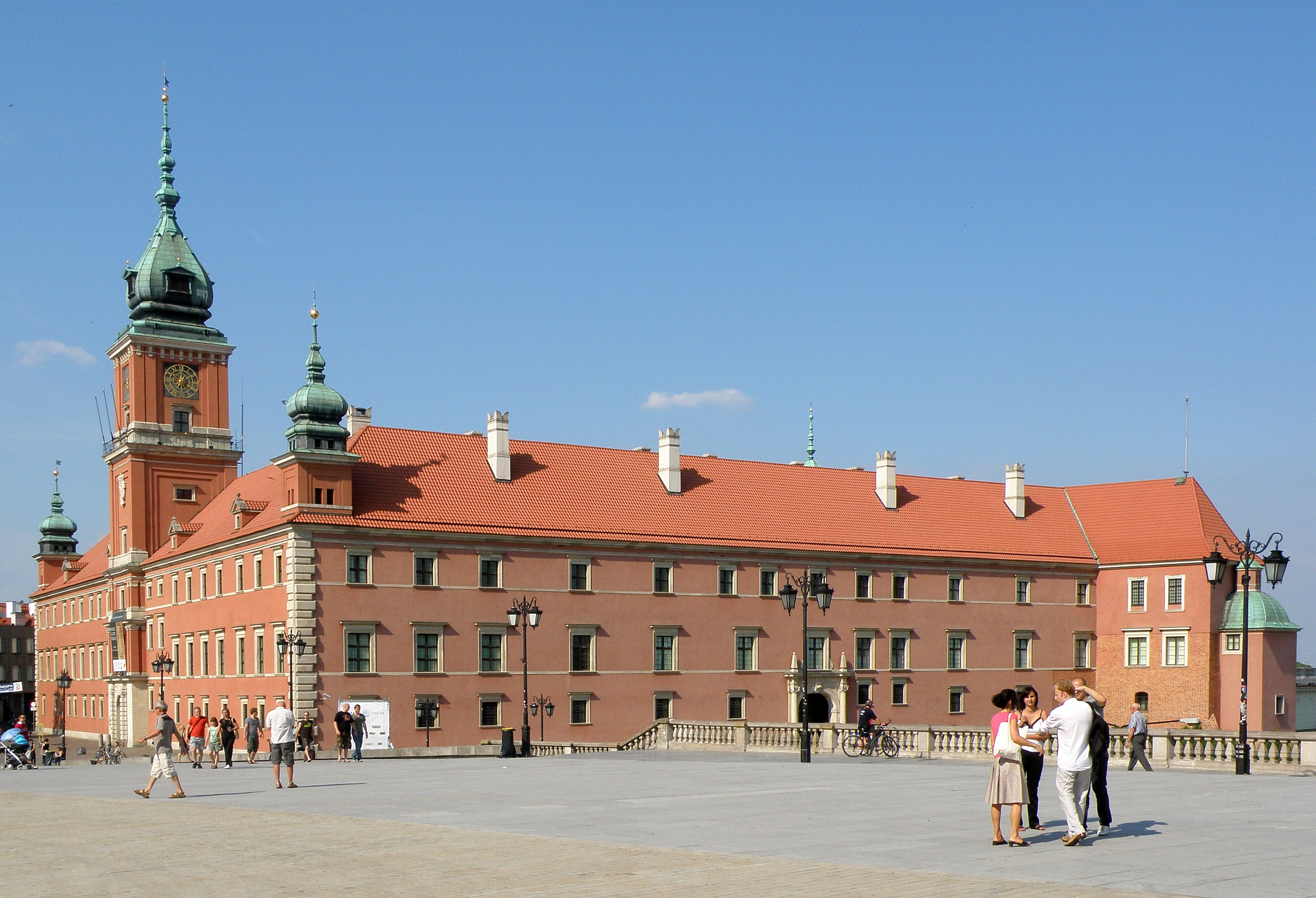
Manierist southern wing of the castle was built to house the offices of Parliament and court.

The Royal Castle in Warsaw was a seat of the Sejm and Senate of the first Rzeczpospolita and also an official residence of the monarchs in Warsaw. It contained the offices of a number of political institutions, arranged around a central courtyard.

The castle is a symbol of Polish statehood and history. Its origins date back almost seven centuries and the design of its present structure has evolved in stages since the fourteenth century. (The actual structure is a mid-20th-century reconstruction of the original castle, which was mostly demolished by German occupiers during World War II.)

== Castle in the Middle Ages ==
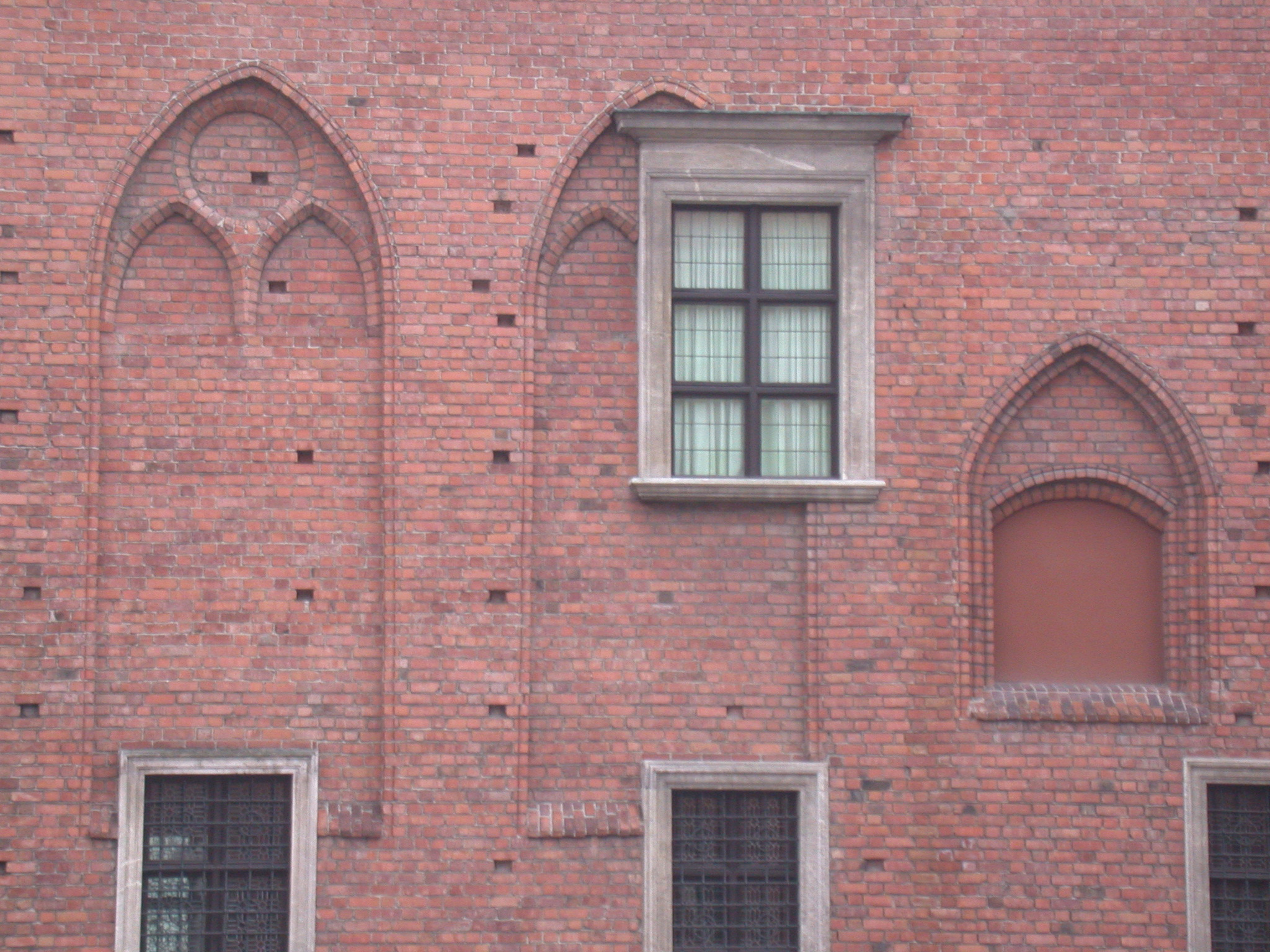
Medieval wall of the Curia Maior.

In the 1339 the Papal Legate in Warsaw heard a case brought by the King of Poland, Kazimierz the Great, against the German Teutonic Order. He claimed that they had illegally seized a slice of Polish territory — Pomerania and the Kujawy region. The documents in this case are the earliest written testimony to the existence of Warsaw. At that time a fortified town surrounded by earthen and wooden ramparts, and situated where the Royal Castle now stands, it was the seat of Trojden, Duke of Masovia. At the end of the 13th century, during the Duke's Conrad II of Mazovia reign, the wooden-earthen gord called Smaller Manor (Latin: Curia Minor) was built. The next duke, Casimir I, decided to build the first brick building here at the burg-city's area the Great Tower (Latin: Turris Magna).

In the middle of the 14th century the Castle Tower, whose structure up to the first storey has survived to this day, was built, while during the reign over Masovia by Duke Janusz I the Elder, the Curia Maior (Big Manor) was erected between 1407 and 1410. Its facade, which was still standing in 1944, was knocked down by the Germans, but has been rebuilt since then. The character of the new residence and its size (47.5 m/14.5 m) decided the change of the buildings status, and from 1414 it functioned as a Prince Manor.

== Renaissance ==
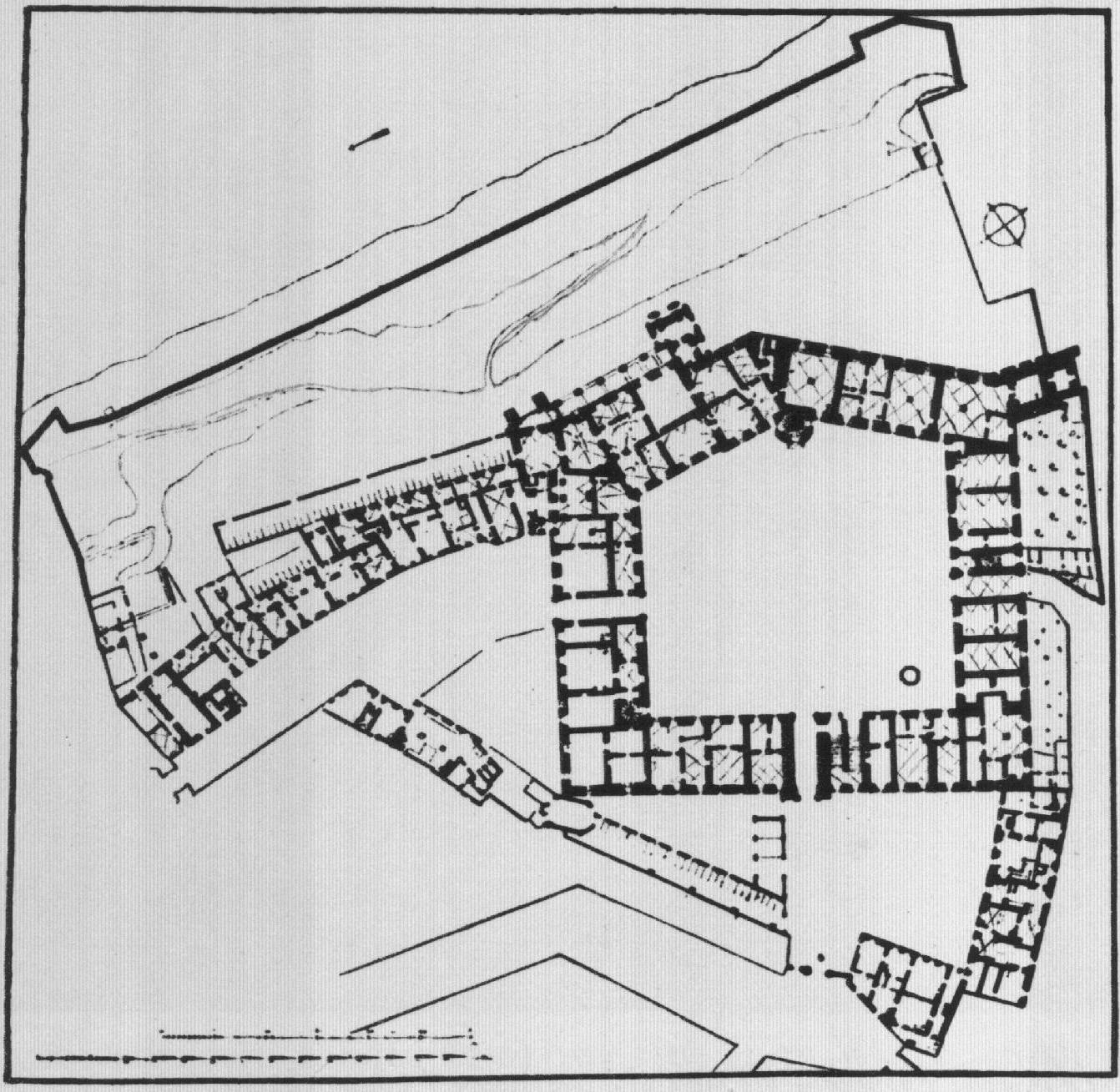
Plan of the Royal Castle in Warsaw at the beginning of the 17th century.

When the Masovia region was incorporated in the Kingdom of Poland in 1526, the edifice, which until then had been the Castle of the Dukes of Masovia, became one of the royal residences. From 1548 onwards Queen Bona Sforza resided in it with her daughters Izabela, who became Queen of Hungary, Catherine, later to become Queen of Sweden, and Anna Jagiellon, later Queen of Poland. In 1556–1557 and in 1564 the King of Poland, Zygmunt August, convened royal parliaments in Warsaw. They met in the Castle. Following the Lublin Union (1569), by which the Polish Crown and the Grand Duchy of Lithuania - were united as a single country, Warsaw Castle was regularly the place where the parliament of the Two-Nations State met. In 1569–1572 King Zygmunt August started alterations in the Castle, the architects being Giovanni Battista di Quadro and Giacopo Pario.

The Curia Maior was altered so as provide a meeting place for the Parliament, with premises for the Chamber of Deputies (Sejm - delegates of the gentry) on the ground floor (the Old Chamber of Deputies), and the Senate Chamber (where the Senators debated in the presence of the King) on the first floor. This was one of the first attempts in Europe to create a building that would be used solely for parliamentary purposes. The parliamentary character of the Curia Maior is stressed by the paintings of the facade — the coats-of-arms of Poland, of Lithuania, and of the various regions from which the delegates were elected. A new Renaissance—style building, known as the "Royal House", was erected next to the Curia Maior. The king resided there when the parliament was in session.

== The Vasas Era and the Deluge ==
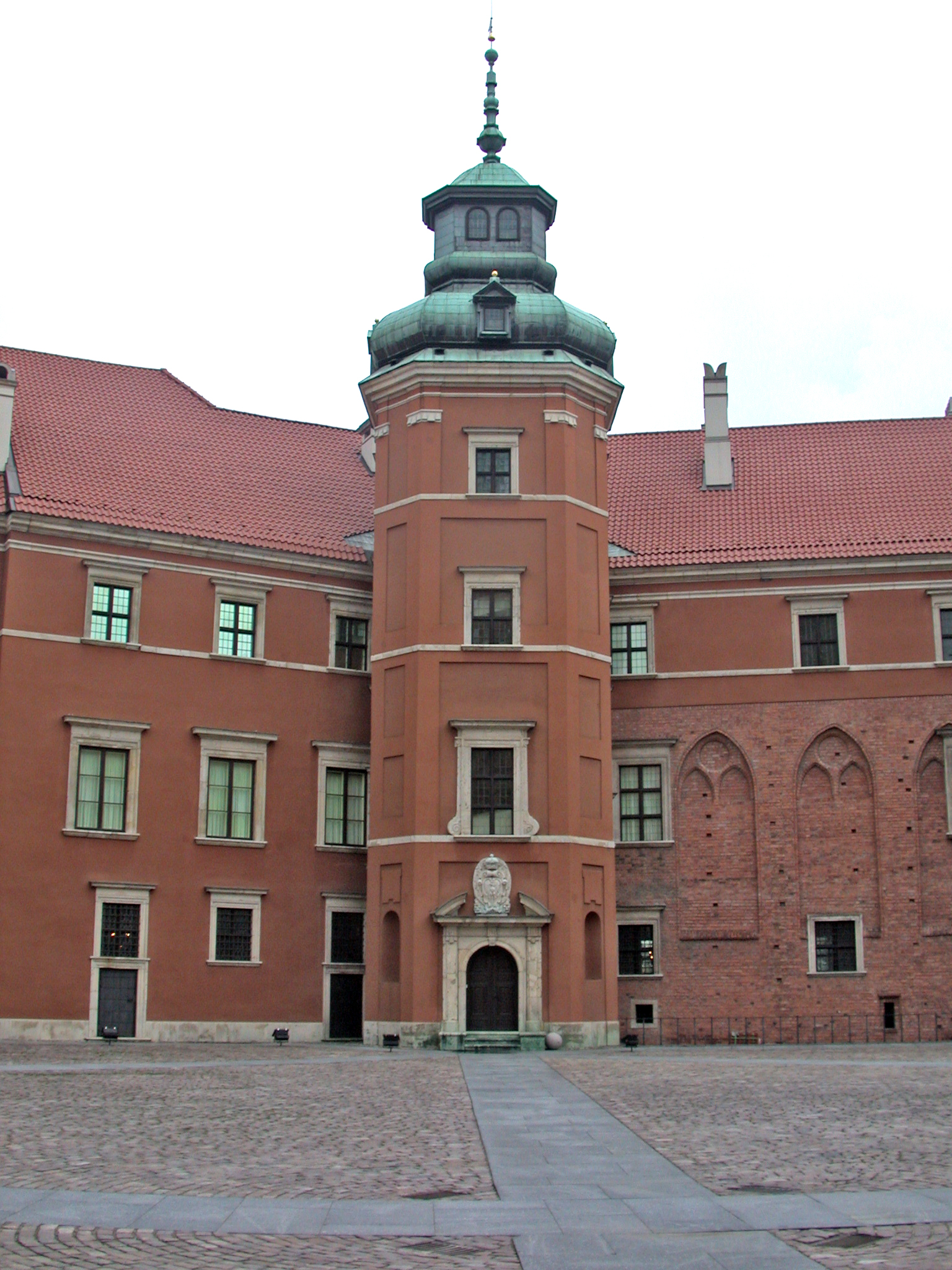
Władysław's Tower

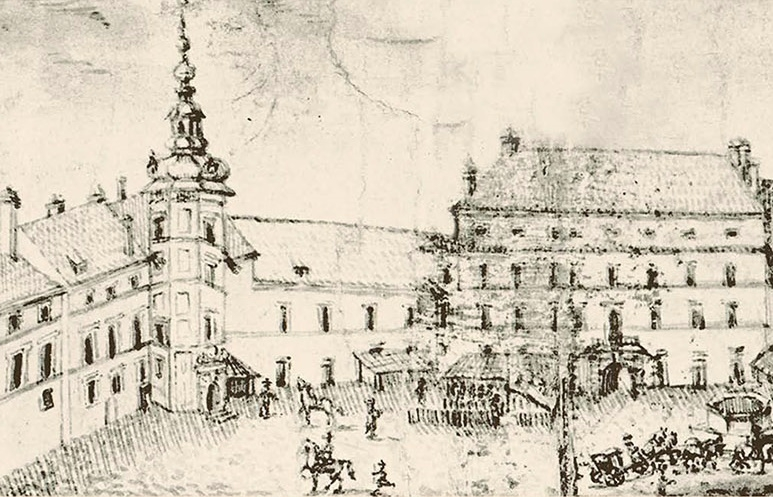
Władysław's Opera Hall

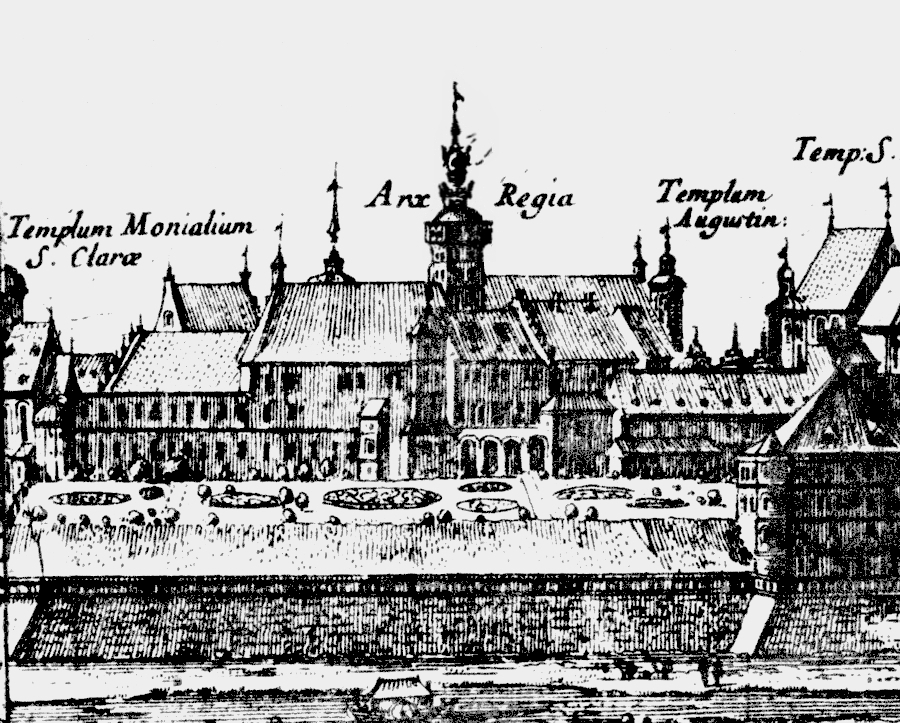
The Royal Castle in 1656

The next alterations to the Castle were made in the reign of Sigismund III, who transferred the royal residence from Kraków to Warsaw. In 1598–1619 the Castle was enlarged. Giovanni Trevano was in charge of the reconstruction. His plans were probably amended by the Venetian architect Vincenzo Scamozzi.

Between 1601–1603 Giacomo Rodondo finished the new northern wing. From 1602 Paolo del Corte was doing stonework. Later after 1614, when Matteo Castelli took the lead, the western wing was built (from today's Plac Zamkowy side) as chancelleries and a marshals office. The southern wing was built at the end. In that way five-wings in a mannerist-early baroque style were built. In 1619 the New Royal Tower (Latin: Nova Turris Regia) also called Sigismund's Tower was finished. It was 60 meters high and was placed in the middle of a newly built west castle 90 meters in length. At the top of the tower, a clock with gilded hands and copper face was placed. The new tower's spire was 13 meters high and had glided knobs and a copper flag at the top.

On 29 October 1611 in the Senator's Chamber, Tsar Vasili IV of Russia, who had been captured by the hetman Stanisław Żółkiewski, paid homage to the Polish king Sigismund III Vasa.

The Polish king Sigismund III and his successors of the Vasa dynasty — Władysław IV Vasa and John II Casimir Vasa — collected many rich works of art in the castle, such as oriental fabrics, tapestries, and numerous paintings by such famous artists as Titian, Veronese, Jacopo, Leandro Bassano, Tintoretto, Palma il Giovane, Antonio Vassilacchi, Tommaso Dolabella, Guercino, Guido Reni, Joseph Heintz, Bartholomeus Spranger, Roelant Savery, Rembrandt, Pieter Soutman, Peter Danckerts de Rij, Peter Paul Rubens, Jan Brueghel the Elder, Daniel Seghers, Georg Daniel Schultz and sculptures by Giambologna, Giovanni Francesco Susini and Adriaen de Vries. These splendid works of art were either destroyed or plundered during the invasions of Poland by Sweden and Germans of Brandenburg during (The Deluge, in 1655–1657). The Swedes and Germans took all the priceless pictures, furniture, tapestries, the royal library, the crown archive, numerous sculptures, whole floors and royal flags. In the castle they had a military Lazareth field hospital, which additionally contributed to the devastation of the buildings. A few months later armies destroyed the rest, plundering most of the copper elements and tearing up the rest of castle's floor.

The majority of the preserved castle furnishings from the Vasa period found its place in the collection of the Visitationist Monastery in Warsaw as donations from the last Vasa, John II Casimir and his wife Marie Louise Gonzaga.

In 1628 the first Polish opera – Galatea, was staged at the Castle. The great opera hall (double-storied, over 50m long), which existed at the Royal Castle, was demolished by Swedes and Germans and rebuilt in the 1660s by King Jan Kazimierz.

== Late Baroque period ==
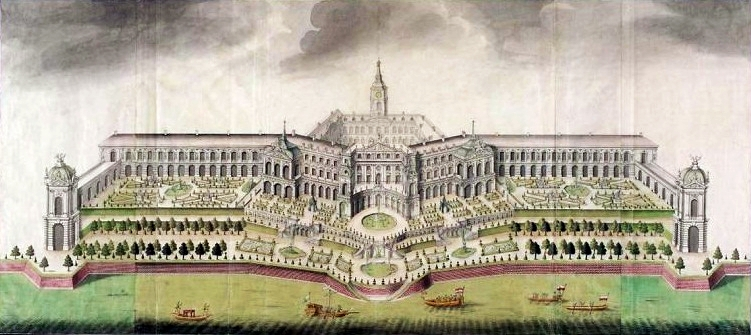
Reconstruction design of the Royal Castle, ca. 1700.

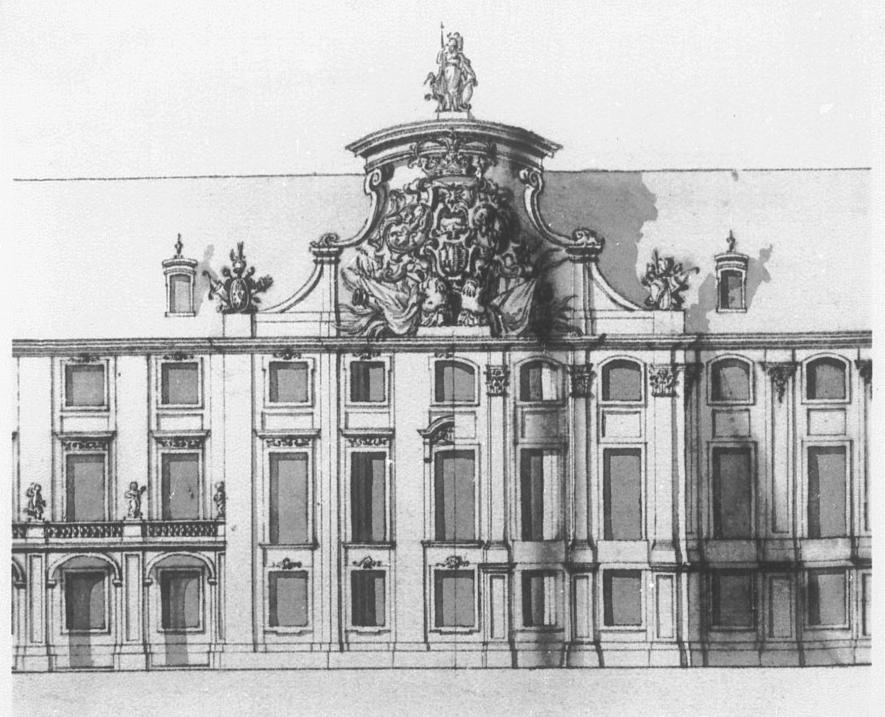
Design of the Eastern wing by G. Chiaveri.

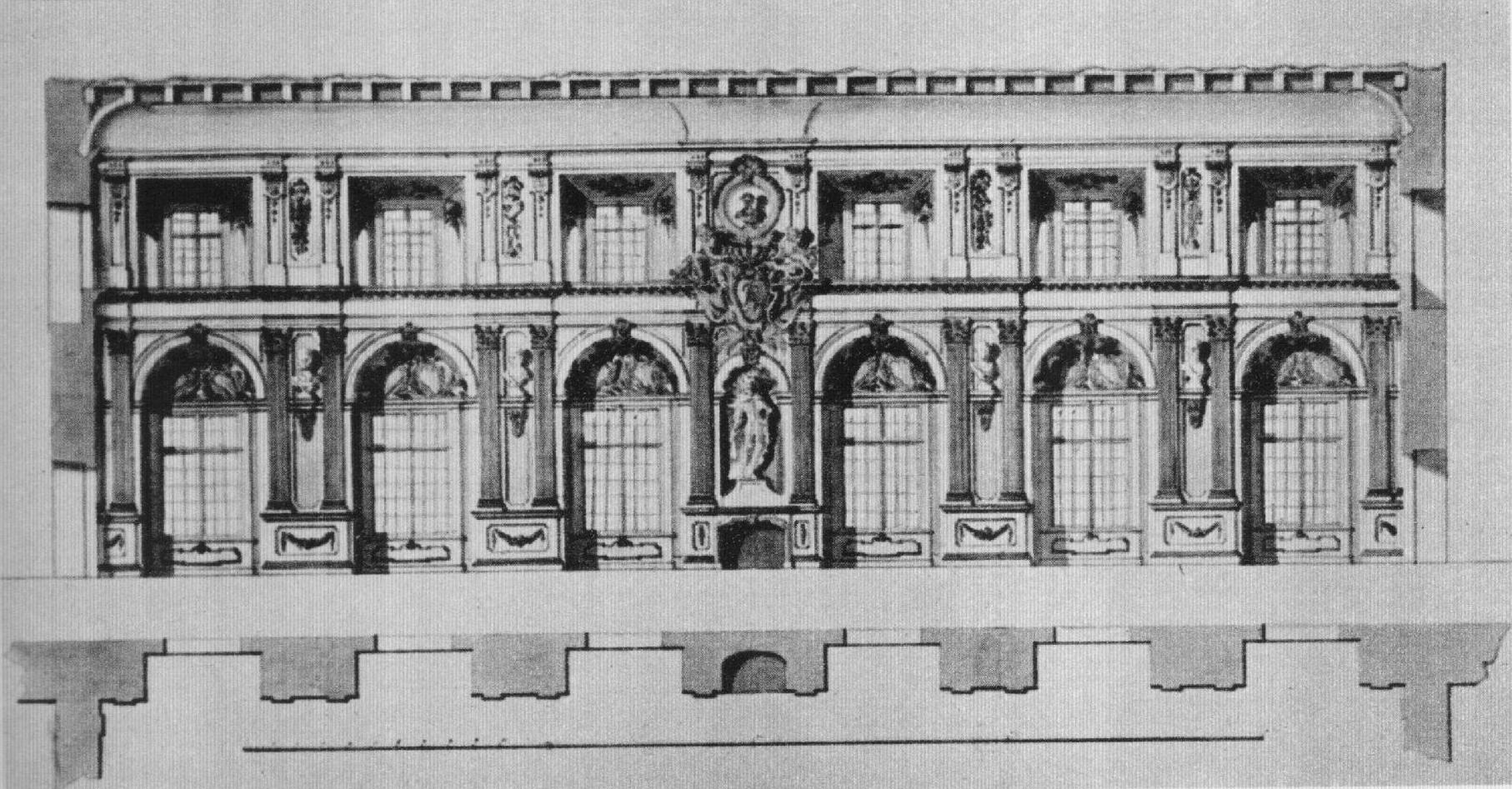
Senate Chamber at the Royal Castle, 1720.

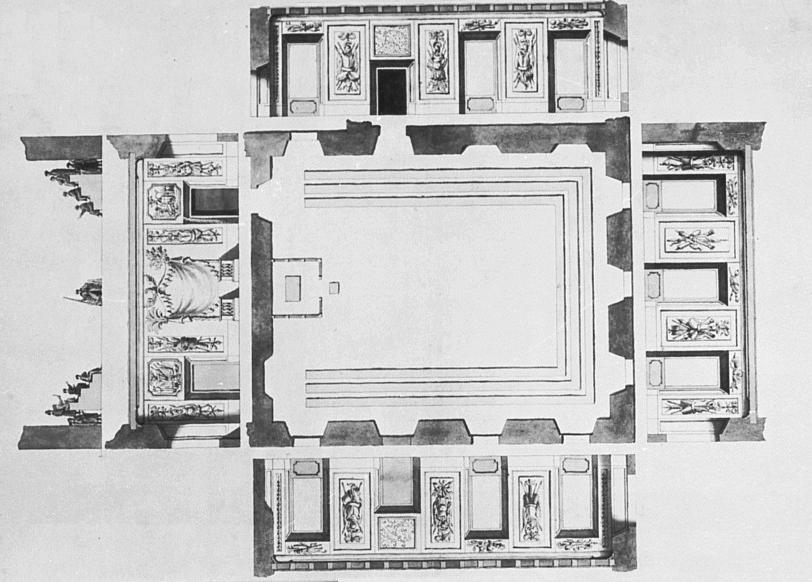
The New Chamber of Deputies at the Royal Castle in the end of the 17th century.

In 1657 the reconstruction of the castle started, under the Italian architect Izydor Affait's guidance. Because of the lack of money the following Polish king, Michał Korybut Wiśniowiecki did not decide on radical rebuilding, just limiting himself to rebuilding destroyed buildings. Because of bad conditions of the residence he had to move to Ujazdów Castle in 1669. Until 1696 when the next Polish king, John III Sobieski died, no serious works were done. They only limited work to current inspections of the building's condition. Sessions of Parliament continued to be held in the castle, as well as various State occasions, such as when the Hohenzollern Dukes of Prussia paid homage to the Kings of Poland and occasions when the king received the ambassadors of foreign countries.

After choosing Augustus II in an election in 1697, the castle again began to deteriorate. A new conflict with the King of Sweden, Charles XII significantly limited the king's budget. Despite problems, in 1698 Augustus II commissioned a residence reconstruction project. In 1700 it was done by Johann Friedrich Karcher, who came from abroad. On 25 May 1702 the Swedes re-seized the Royal Castle in Warsaw, creating a hospital with 500 beds, and into The Chamber of Deputies and ministers’ rooms, they placed a stable. During the Polish army's siege in 1704 the castle was retaken. However, it was soon retaken once more by Sweden's army. In 1707, by virtue of the peace treaty between Augustus II and Charles XII of Sweden, Russian allied troops entered Warsaw, and Tsar Peter I of Russia settled in the castle. After two months, Russian forces were removed from Warsaw, taking with them works of art from the castle, including Tommaso Dolabella's pictures, which included two that were very important for Russians: The Defense of Smolensk and Russian Tsar Vasili IV compelled to kneel before Polish King Sigismund III of Poland. The Władysław's Opera Hall was completely devastated and was never restored.

The reconstruction according to Karcher's plans began from 1713 to 1715. In 1717 the Parliament Hall was completely rebuilt. It was used to serve the Saxon rulers as a coronation hall. During the following years, between 1722 and 1723, the other castle halls were converted-under the direction of architect Joachim Daniel von Jauch, the new Senate Chamber was built, and all the furnishings moved from the old to the new location, including among others: 60 Polish provincial emblems, paneling, mouldings and lizens. On 31 May 1732, a fire broke out in the castle destroying the west elevation and part of the Zygmunt's Tower and the exterior façade sculptures, known as armature.

The next reconstruction project of the Royal Castle appeared after Augustus III took to the Polish throne in 1733. New plans, which were formed in 1734 and developed in 1737 by architect Gaetano Chiaveri, saw among other things, the reconstruction of the castle's façade on the Vistula side in the rococo style, which was meant to form a new so called Saxon elevation and also the conversion of the north-east part with the Altana Tower, where it was planned for 3 two-storey rysalits to be built on. The reconstruction work according to these plans was carried out with various intensity between 1740 and 1752. During the period of 1740-1747 the façade on the Vistula side was reconstructed in the late baroque style (architects: Gaetano Chiaveri, Carl Friedrich Pöppelmann, Jan Krzysztof Knöffel). One of the best sculptors who did work on the castle in this period was Jan Jerzy Plersch, who made the royal decorative frames, mouldings and statues called the Famous Figures, which held the royal crowns on the top of the middle rysalit, of the Saxon elevation, on the Vistula side. The last reconstruction work of this period was finished by late 1763, after the death of Augustus III, when Plersch made the last sculptures and frames with province emblems for the Parliament Hall.

== The Stanisław August period ==
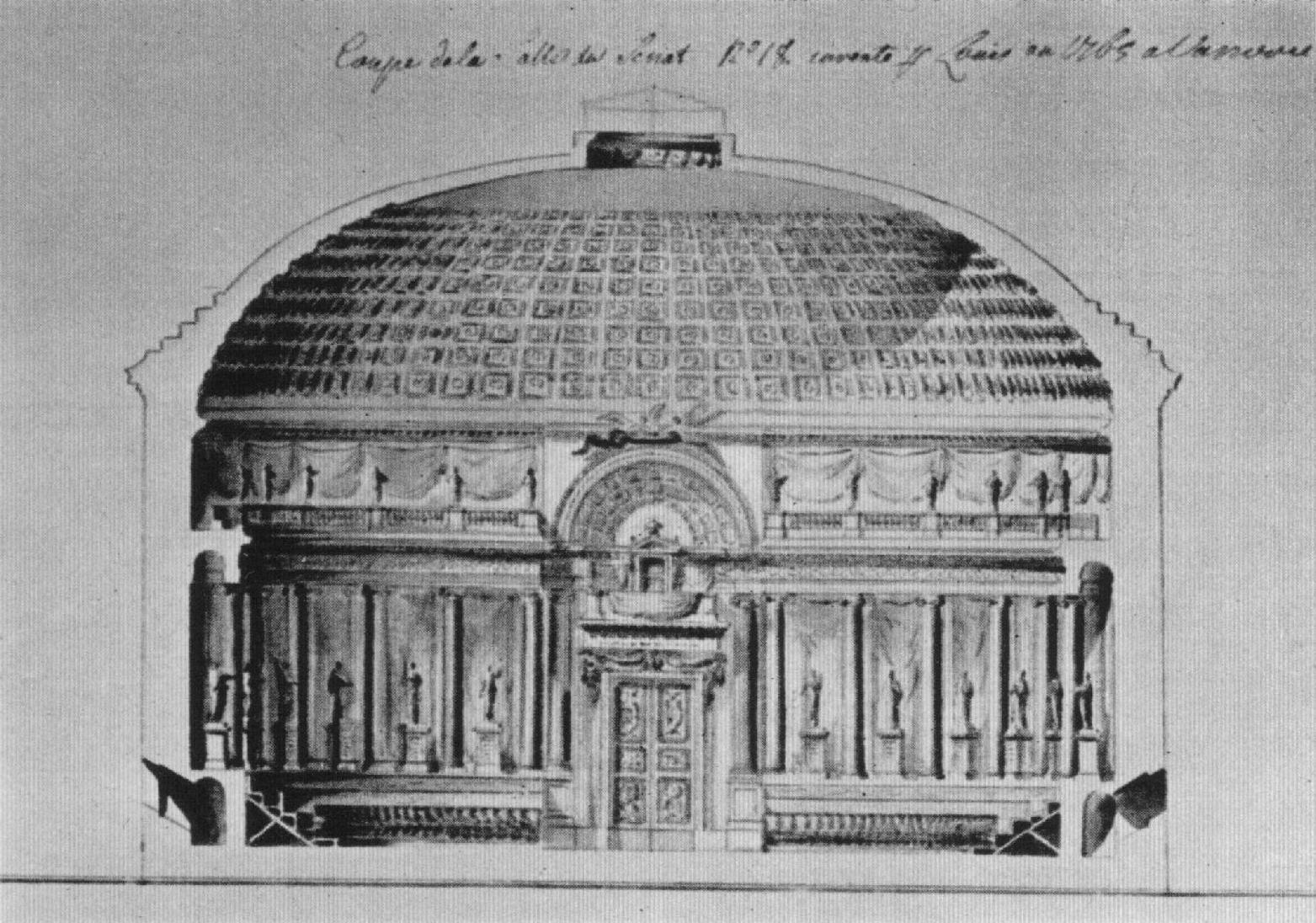
Reconstruction design of the Senate Chamber at the Royal Castle, V. Louis.

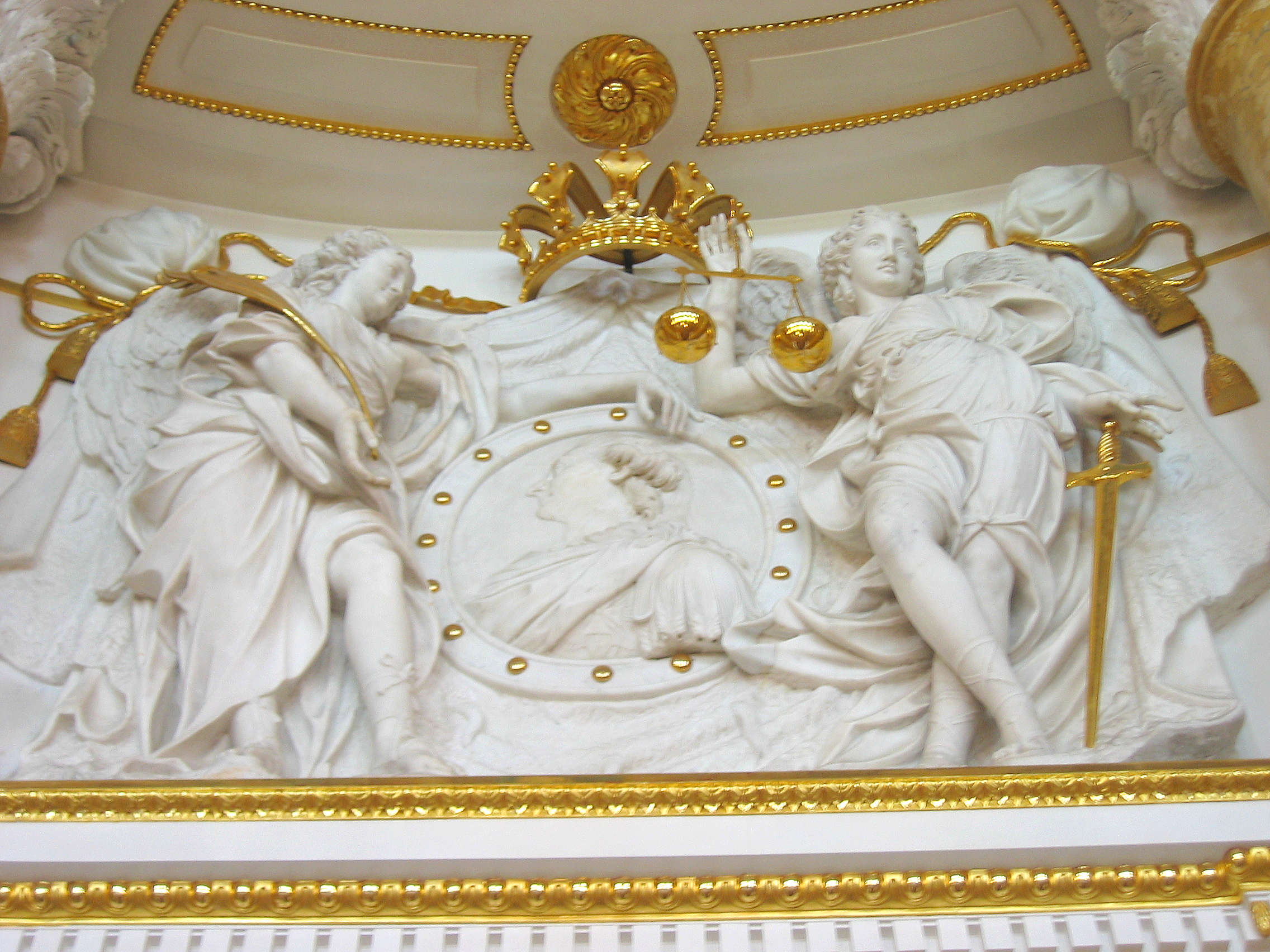
Apotheosis of King Stanisław August in the Ballroom, André le Brun, ca. 1780.

The most splendid period in the history of the Castle was during the rule of Stanisław August Poniatowski (1764–1795). This monarch collected exquisite works of art, many of which have survived to this day. He recruited first-rate architects such as Jakub Fontana, Merlini, Kamsetzer, and Kubicki, to work on the castle, as well as splendid painters such as Marcello Bacciarelli, Bernardo Bellotto (otherwise known as Canaletto), Franciszek Smuglewicz, Kazimierz Wojniakowski, and Jean-Baptiste Pillement and eminent sculptors such as André le Brun and Jakub Monaldi, and famous French artists such as the architect Victor Louis. The total reconstruction of the castle planned by the king did not come to fruition, but the interior was changed to the neoclassical style - although this, known in Poland as the Stanisław August style, was rather different from neo—classicism in the rest of Europe.

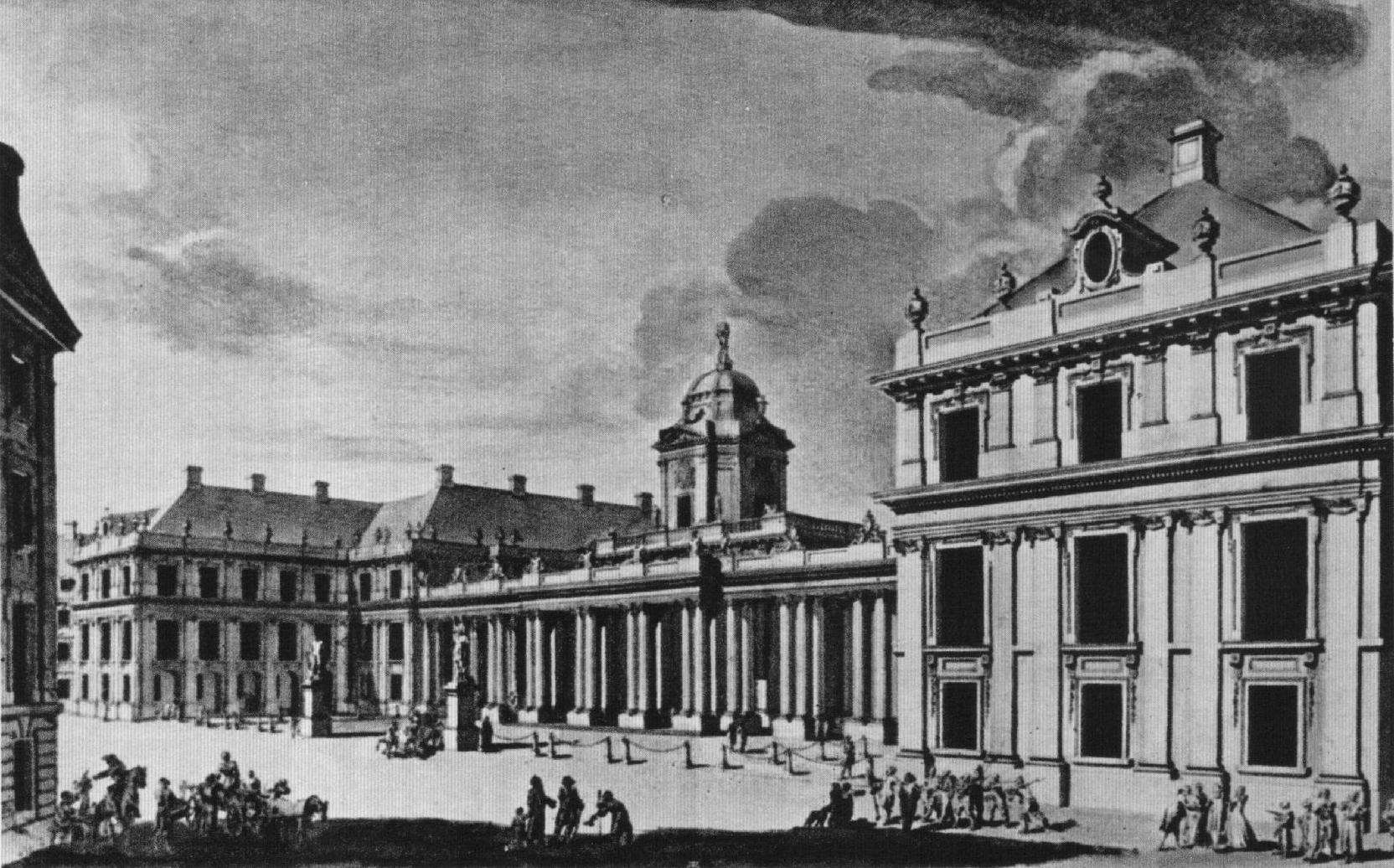
Reconstruction design of the Royal Castle in Warsaw by J. Fontana.

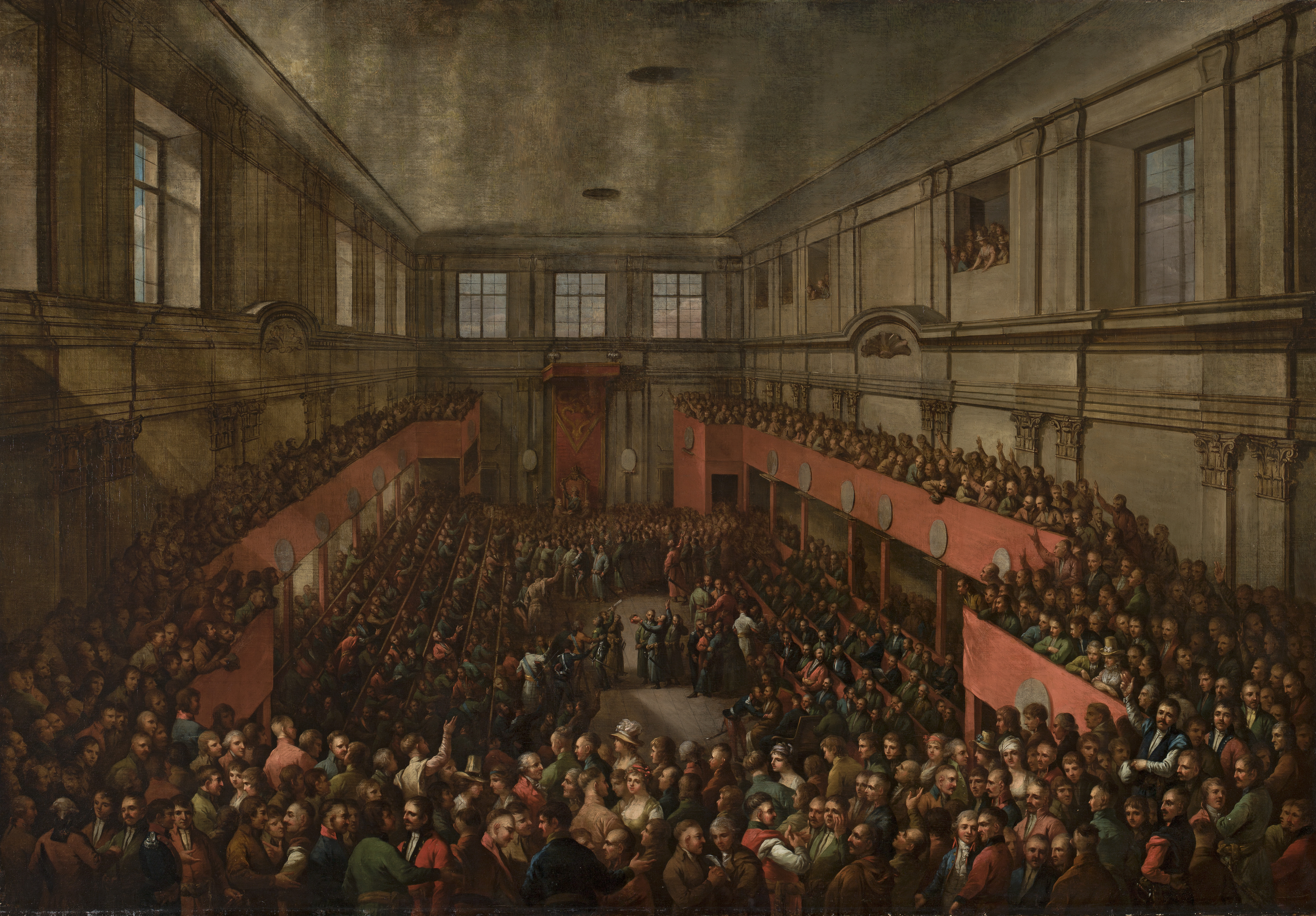
In 1791, the Great Sejm (or Four-Year Sejm) of 1788–1792 and Senate adopt the May 3rd Constitution at the Royal Castle.

During 1766–1785 on the basis of Jakub Fontana's plans, the southern wing of the castle, which was burnt on 15 December 1767 was rebuilt (2 destroyed floors, a new elevation on the south side with three rysalits, the division of the façade by lizens and Jon capital pilasters). Between 1774 and 1777 the monarch's private apartments were furnished. They consisted of the Prospect Room (with landscapes by Canaletto), the chapel, the Audience Chamber, and the Bedchamber, while between 1779 and 1786 the Senate Apartments were completed, consisting of the Ballroom, the Knights Hall, the Throne Room, the Marble Room, and the Conference Chamber. These rooms contained pictures and sculptures depicting great events in Poland's history, as well as portraits of Polish kings, generals, statesmen and scholars (including Copernicus and Adam Naruszewicz). The Castle also housed the rich royal collections including 3200 pictures, classical statues, about 100 000 graphics, in addition to medals, coins, and a fine library, to house which a separate building was erected in 1780–1784. The new library building housed many books, gems, drawings, coins, maps and plans belonging to the monarch. The Royal Library's book collection amounted to 16 000 volumes of various works, 25,525 drawings, 44,842 etchings in 726 bound volumes, overall a number of 70,000 etchings—fancy dress balls were also held in this hall.

Up until 1786 Stanisław August Poniatowski tried a few times to change the outside decor of the Castle and to build an architectural castle square, he was not however successful in carrying out these plans.

During this period, the Castle was the place where the ideas of the Polish Enlightenment first flourished. The king held "Thursday lunches" at the Castle, for scientists, scholars, writers and artists. This was where the idea for the National Education Commission; one of the first secular Ministries of Education in Europe, was mooted. The Castle was the place where the first proposals were made for a Knights' School, and for a national theatre. It was in the Senate Chamber in the Castle that what was known as the "Great Sejm" (Great Parliament) passed the famous Polish Constitution of 3rd May, 1791. During the ceremony the King was carried out to the nearby church of St.John. In honour of this occasion a marble plaque with Ignacy Krasicki's text written on it was set into the wall of the Castle.

== In partitioned Poland and the Second Republic ==
Between 19 and 20 December 1806 and 1–30 January 1807, Napoleon Bonaparte, the French emperor, spent his time at the Castle. Here in 1807 he made the decision to form a Warsaw duchy, which was to be ruled by the Saxon prince Frederick August I, using the Royal castle as his residence. Prince Józef Poniatowski, Commander-in-Chief of the Polish Army and Marshal of France, resided in the Copper-Roof Palace joined to the Castle. After the creation of the constitutional Kingdom of Poland (1815) its parliaments met here at the Castle. As Kings of Poland, the Russian Tsars Alexander I and Nicholas I also resided in the castle when they stayed in Warsaw. During the November Uprising, on 25 January 1831, the Sejm debating in the castle dethroned Tsar of Russia, Nicholas I as Polish king.

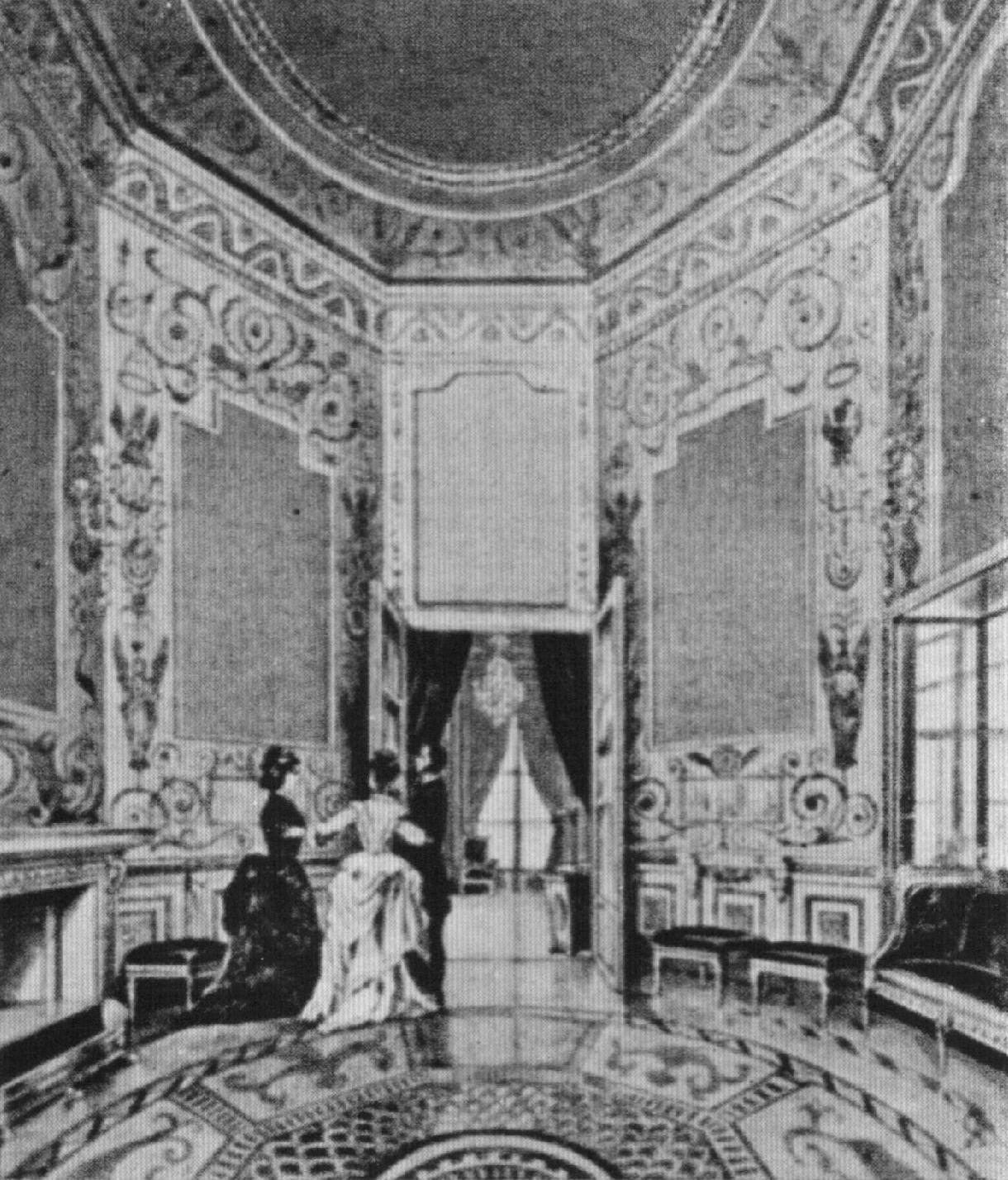
Conference Room at the Castle without paintings (stolen by the Russians).

In 1836, after abolishing the division into voivodeships in the Congress Poland, they were replaced by the guberniyas. During that time, the Royal Castle became the residence of the Tsar's governor Ivan Paskievich. Paskievich charged Ludvik Corio – a Russian Colonel and architect – with designing new elevations and facades (the west, south and east parts). However, Russian authorities were not satisfied with the new designs and Corio was told to prepare another design – one that would refer to Kubicki's solutions (and his co-workers Lelewel and Thomas). Finally, Corio rebuilt all the elevations and facades in the neoclassical style, but the Saxon Elevation was left the same. After the death of Paskievich in 1856, all the next governors resided in the Royal Castle's Chamberlain's Room. The Russian officials occupied rooms on both floors of the west and north wings of the castle. The governors were heavily guarded by the Russian army. Unfortunately, the living space that was assigned to these soldiers was the Parliamentary Hall, Library and barracks under the Castle. As a result, these were left devastated.

After the January Uprising in 1863, the Russian army totally destroyed the Royal garden on the Vistula side (which was transformed into the military parade square), building a few barracks made of brick for stables and Cossacks’ barracks. In 1862-1863 some maintenance work was done in the Royal Castle under the supervision of Jerzy Orłowicz, Ludwik Gosławski and Potolov. In 1890 the Saxon Elevation was rebuilt under the supervision of a builder January Kiślański, when the arcades of both viewing galleries, dating back to the August III period, were deformed. The last repair works, which cost 28 000 rubles, during the reign of Russia, were in 1902 in the rooms which had been occupied by the Russian army.

During the First World War it was the residence of the German military governor. After Poland regained her independence in 1918, the Castle became the residence of the President of Poland. It was lovingly restored under the guidance of Kazimierz Skórewicz (1920-1928) and Adolf Szyszko-Bohusz (until 1939). Under the terms of the Peace Treaty signed with Soviet Russia at Riga in 1920, works of art and other precious things, including all the castle furnishings, which had been taken away to Russia, were brought back to Poland. As a result, it was possible to restore the historic rooms to their appearance in the reign of Stanisław August Poniatowski.

== During World War II ==
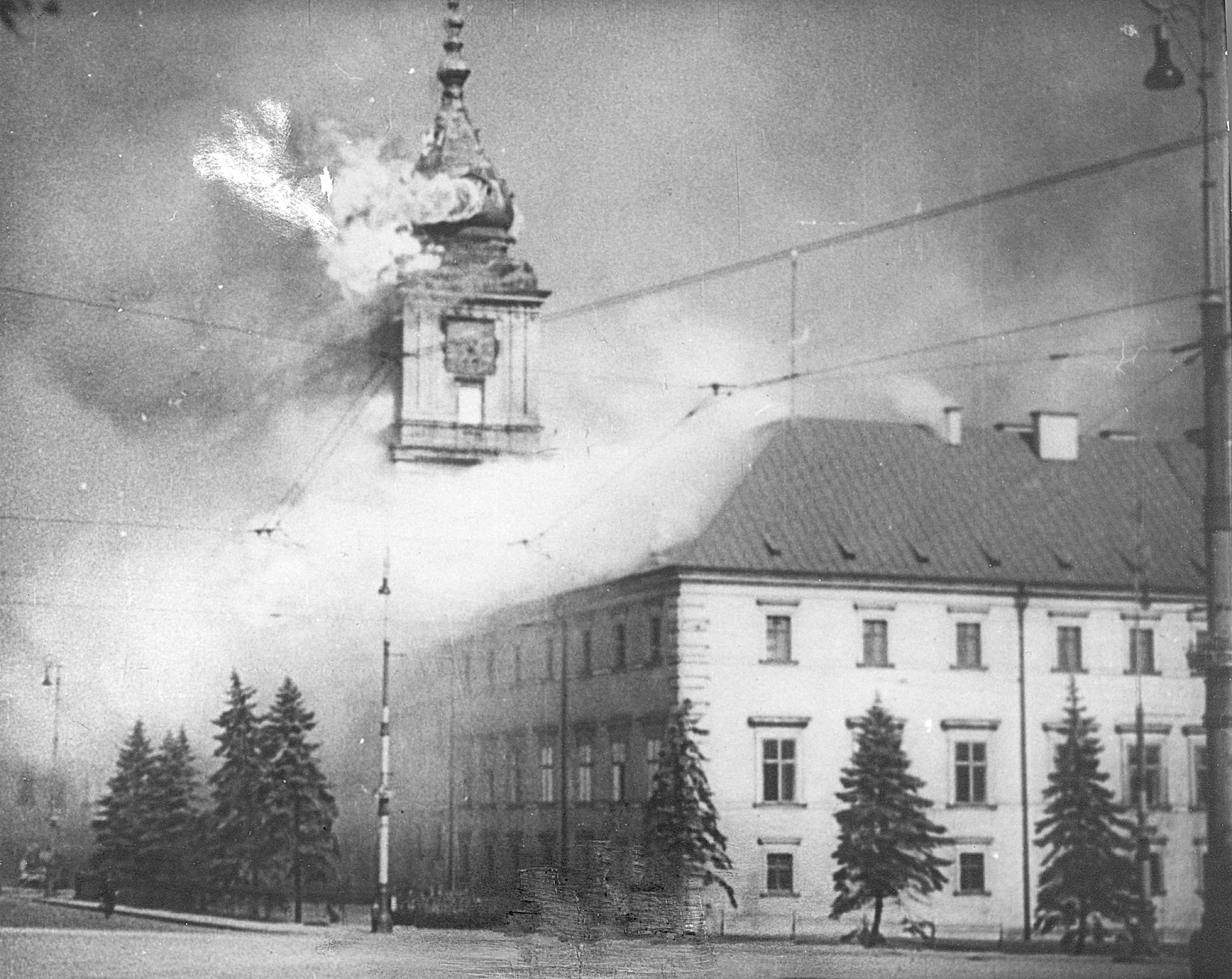
Royal Castle in flames following German bombardment, September 17, 1939.

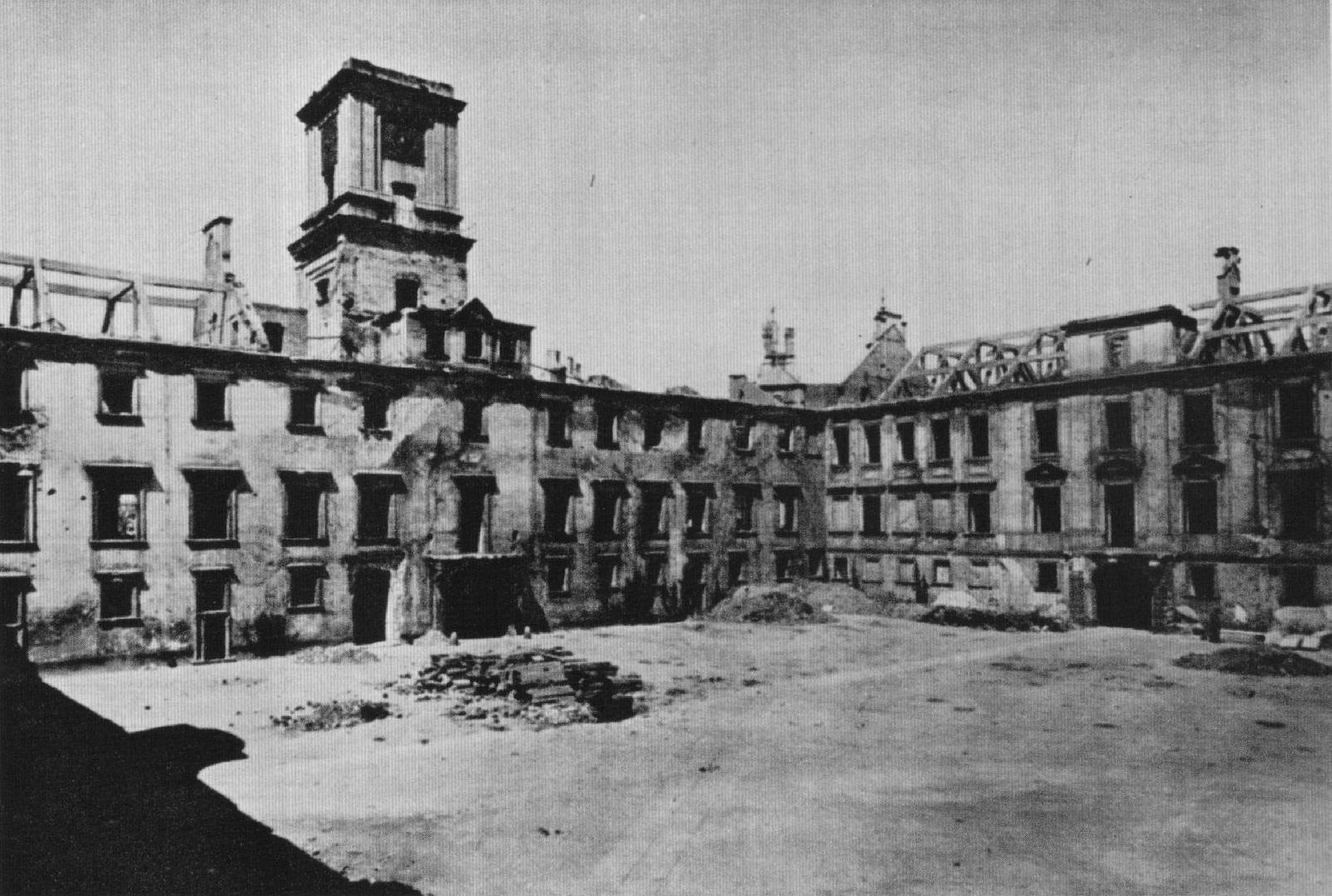
Royal Castle in 1941 without roofs, deliberately removed by the Germans to accelerate the devastation process.

On September 17, 1939, the Castle was shelled by German artillery. The roof and the turrets were destroyed by fire (they were partly restored by the Castle's staff, but later deliberately removed by the Germans). The ceiling of the Ballroom collapsed, resulting in the destruction of Bacciarelli's beautiful ceiling fresco The Creation of the World. The other rooms were slightly damaged. But immediately after the seizure of Warsaw by the Germans, their occupation troops set to demolish the castle. The more valuable objects, even including the central heating and ventilation installations, were dismantled and taken away to Germany.

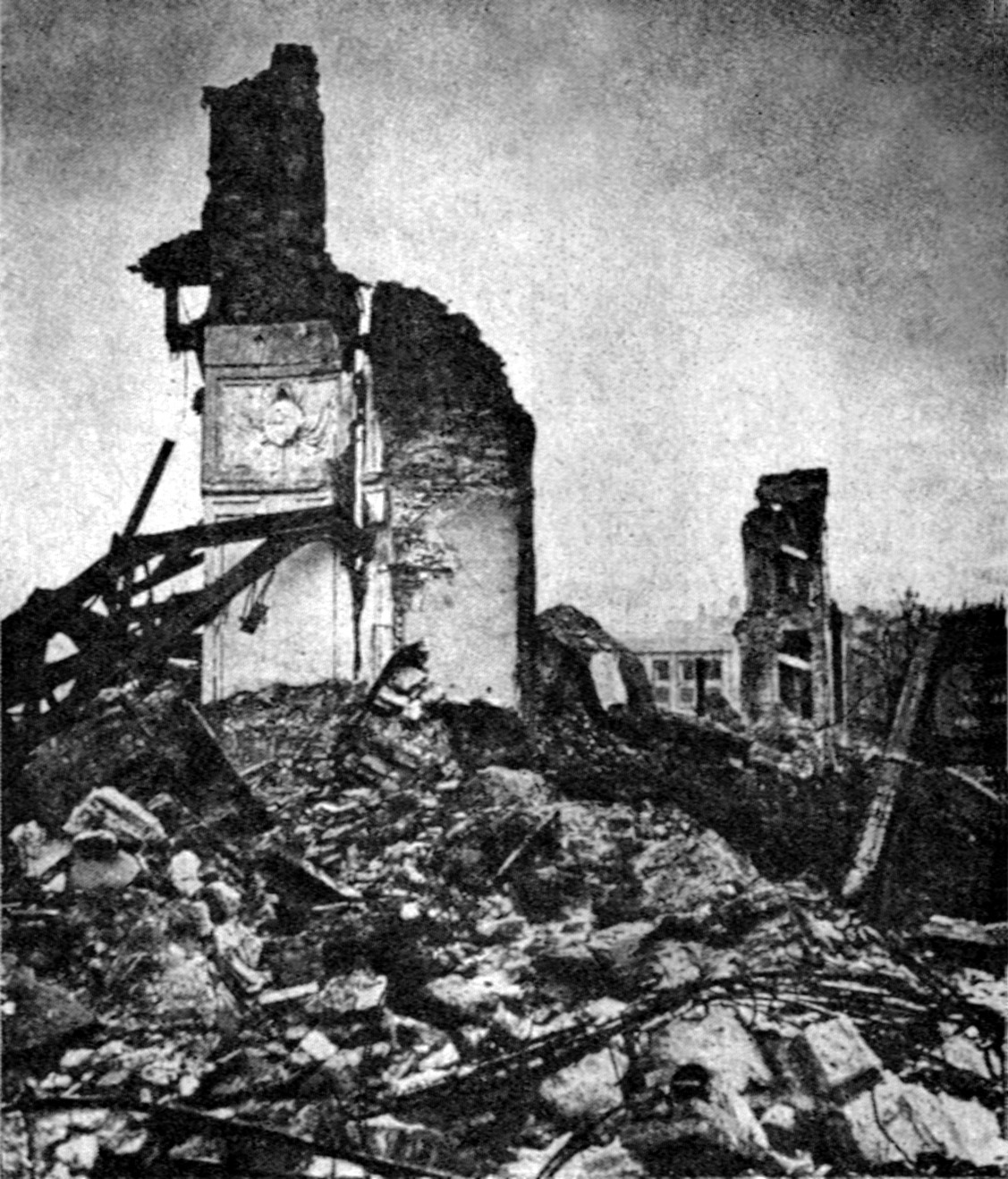
Pro Fide, Lege et Grege.

On 4 October 1939 in Berlin, Adolf Hitler issued the order to blow up the Royal Castle. On 10 October 1939, special German units, under the supervision of history and art experts (Dr. Dagobert Frey, an art historian at the University of Wrocław; Gustaw Barth, the director of museums in Wrocław, and Dr. Joseph Mühlmann, an art historian from Vienna) started to demount floor, marbles, sculptures and stone elements such as fireplaces or moulds. The priceless artefacts were taken to Germany or stored in Kraków's warehouses. Many of them were also seized by various Nazi dignitaries who resided in Warsaw. The Castle was totally emptied. Disobeying German orders, and always in danger of being shot, Polish museum staff and experts in art restoration managed to save many of the works of art from the castle, as well as fragments of the stucco-work, the parquet floors, the wood panelling, and more. These were used in the reconstruction. The great service done to Poland by Professor Stanisław Lorentz, in leading this campaign to save the castle's treasures, is well known. Wehrmacht sappers then bored tens of thousands of holes for dynamite charges in the stripped walls.

In 1944, after the collapse of the Warsaw Uprising, when hostilities had already ceased, the Germans blew up the Castle's demolished walls. Leveling the Royal Castle was only a part of a larger plan – the Pabst Plan – the goal of which was to build a monumental Community Hall (ger. Volkshalle) or an equally sizable Congress Hall of NSDAP (National Socialist German Workers Party - ger. Parteivolkshalle) in the Royal Castle's place and to replace the Zygmunt's Column with the Germania Monument.

A pile of rubble, surmounted by only two fragments of walls that somehow managed to survive, was all that was left of the six-hundred-year-old edifice. On one of these fragments, almost like a symbol, part of the stucco decoration remained. This was a cartouche with the royal version of the motto of the Order of the White Eagle — "PRO FIDE, LEGE ET REGE" (for Faith, Law, and the Nation - literally translated, the last word means a herd).

== Reconstruction ==
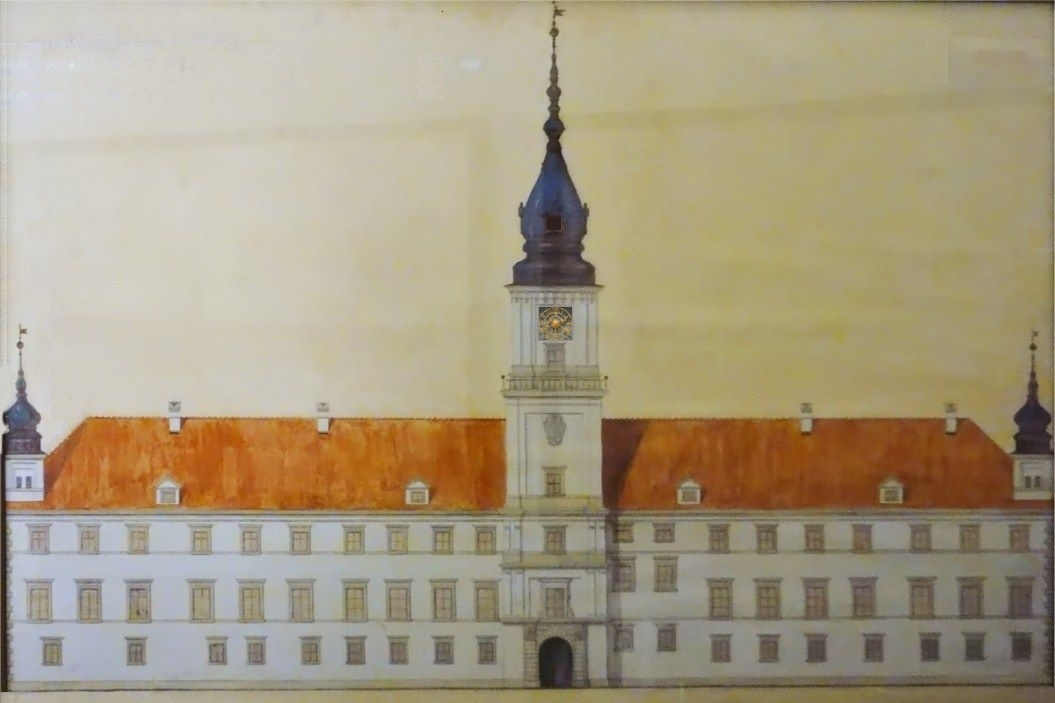
Conception of reconstruction

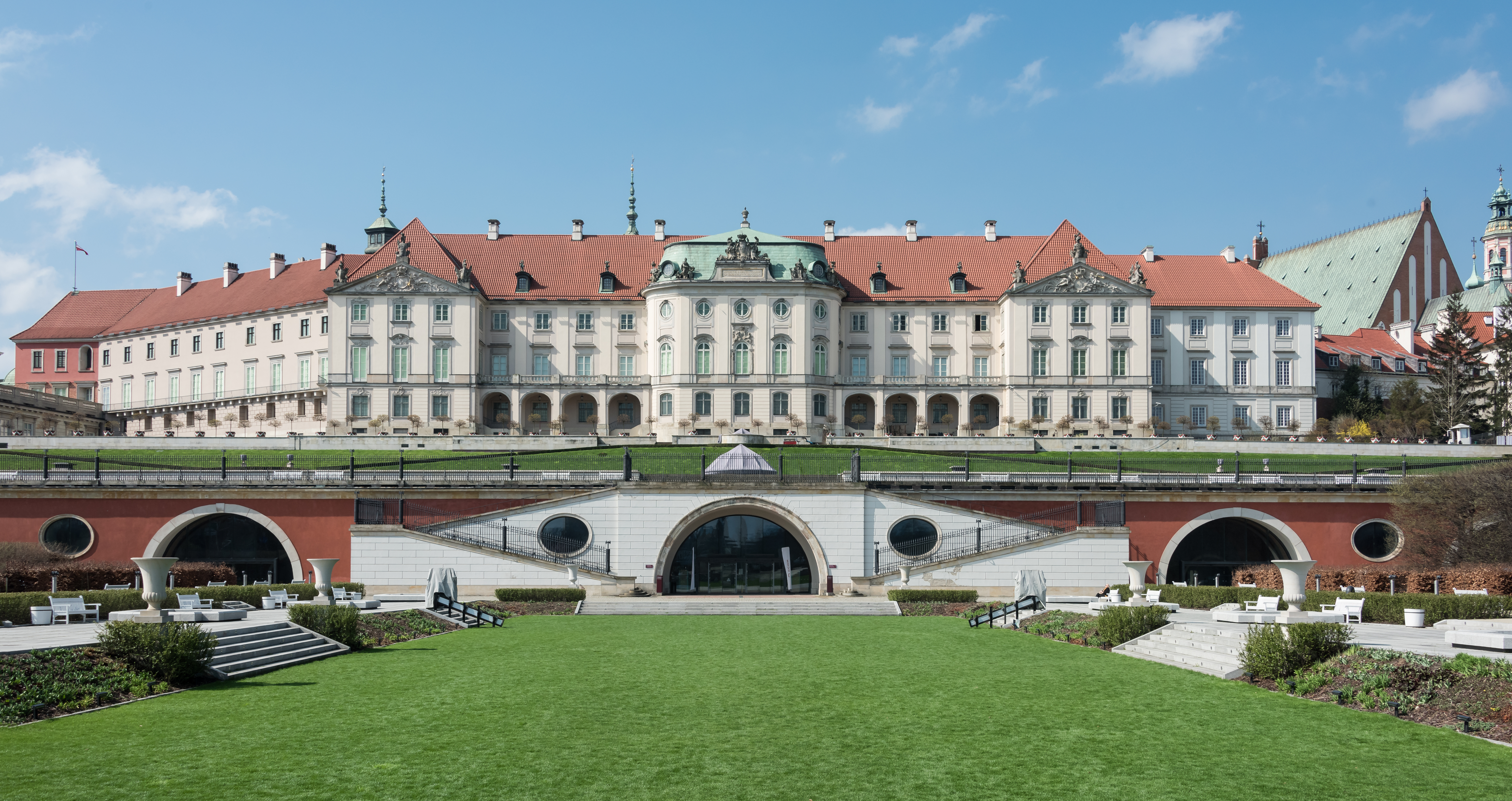
Castle, seen from river side

Immediately after the end of war in 1945, work started on rescuing the surviving fragments of the castle's walls, foundations, and cellars as well as the fire-blackened walls of the Copper-Roof Palace and the Royal Library building, from further destruction. In 1949 the Polish Parliament passed a bill to rebuild the Castle as a monument to Polish history and culture. Meanwhile, special architectural designing offices, under Jan Dąbrowski, Piotr Biegański and Jan Zachwatowicz, drew up blueprints for restoring the framework of the building and furnishing the historical rooms. The decision to start work was postponed several times, but was finally taken on 20 January 1971. A Civic Committee was set up. Amid universal applause it was decided to rebuild the castle from voluntary contributions. Both, in Poland and abroad fund-raising committees were set up.

By May 1975 the Fund had already reached the 500 million złotys. By the same date more than a thousand valuable works of art had been given to the Castle by numerous Poles resident both in Poland and abroad. Official representatives of other countries have likewise presented to the Castle works of art of great artistic and historic value.

== See also ==
- List of mannerist structures in Central Poland

== Bibliography ==
1. Lileyko Jerzy (1980). Vademecum Zamku Warszawskiego (in Polish). Warsaw. ISBN 83-223-1818-9.
2. Lileyko Jerzy (1984). Życie codzienne w Warszawie za Wazów (in Polish). Warsaw. ISBN 83-06-01021-3.
3. Stefan Kieniewicz, ed. (1984). Warszawa w latach 1526-1795 (Warsaw in 1526-1795) (in Polish). Warsaw. ISBN 83-01033-23-1.
4. Aleksander Gieysztor, ed. (1972). Zamek Królewski w Warszawie (in Polish). Warsaw.

== Gallery ==
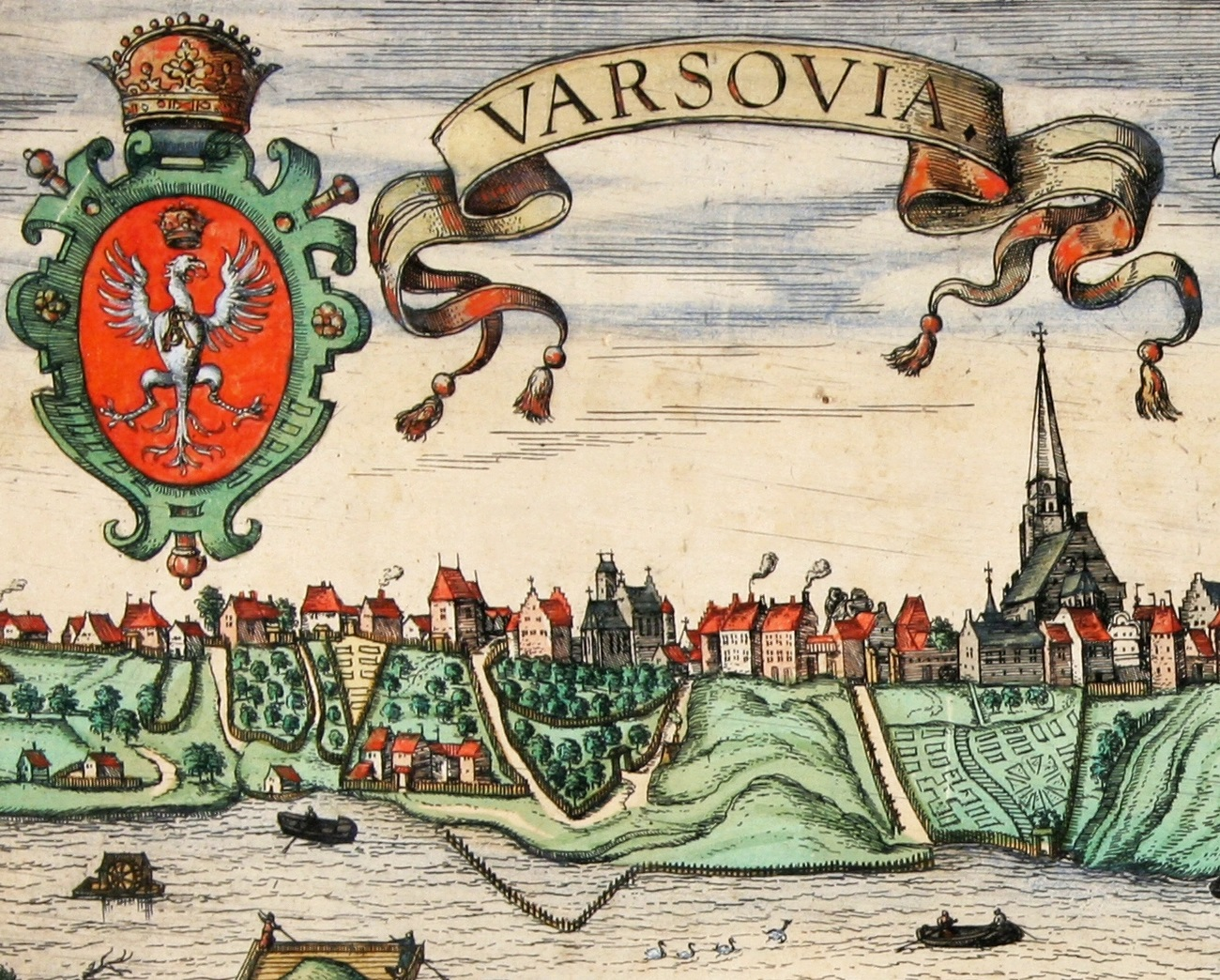
1611

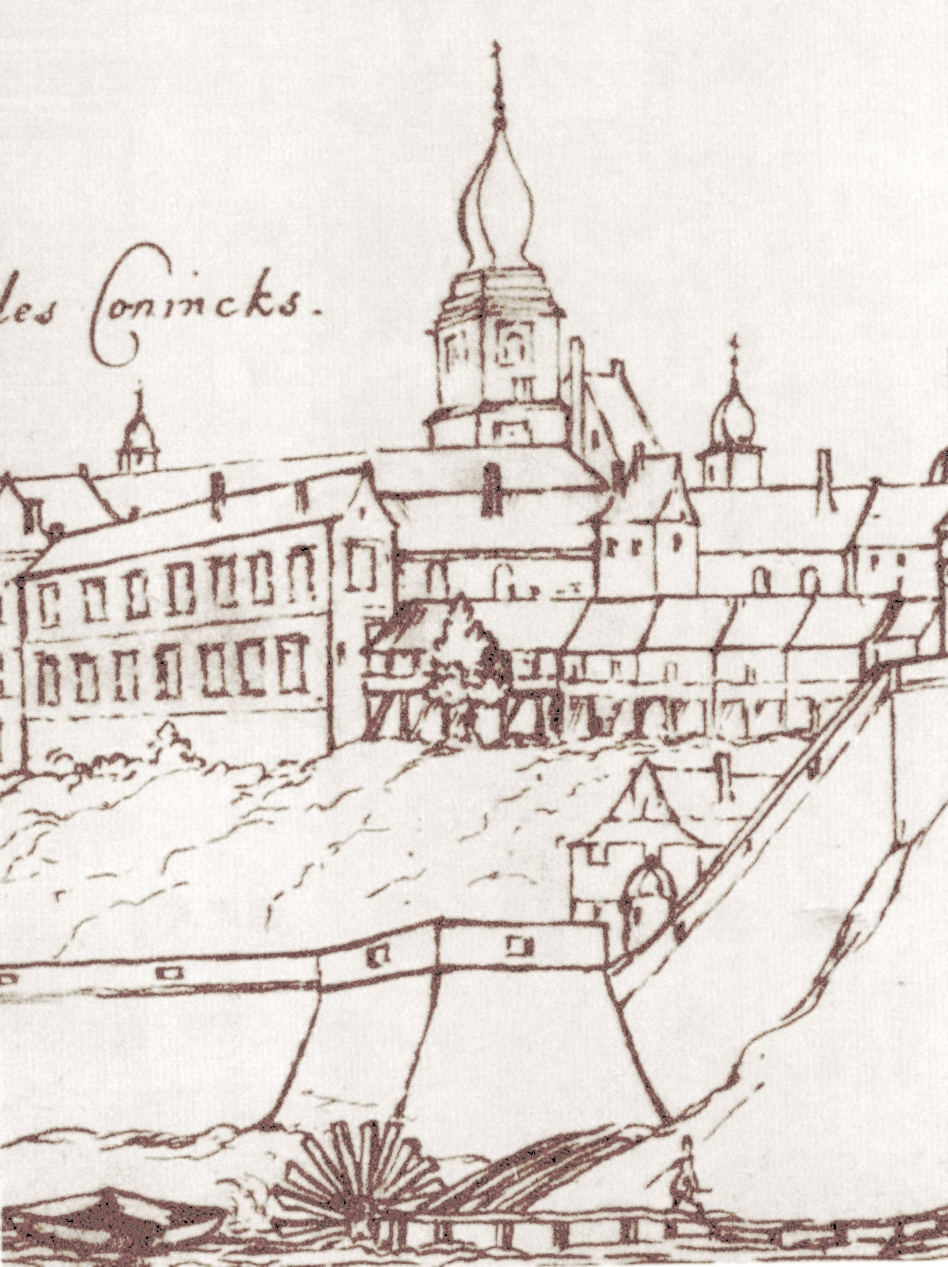
1627

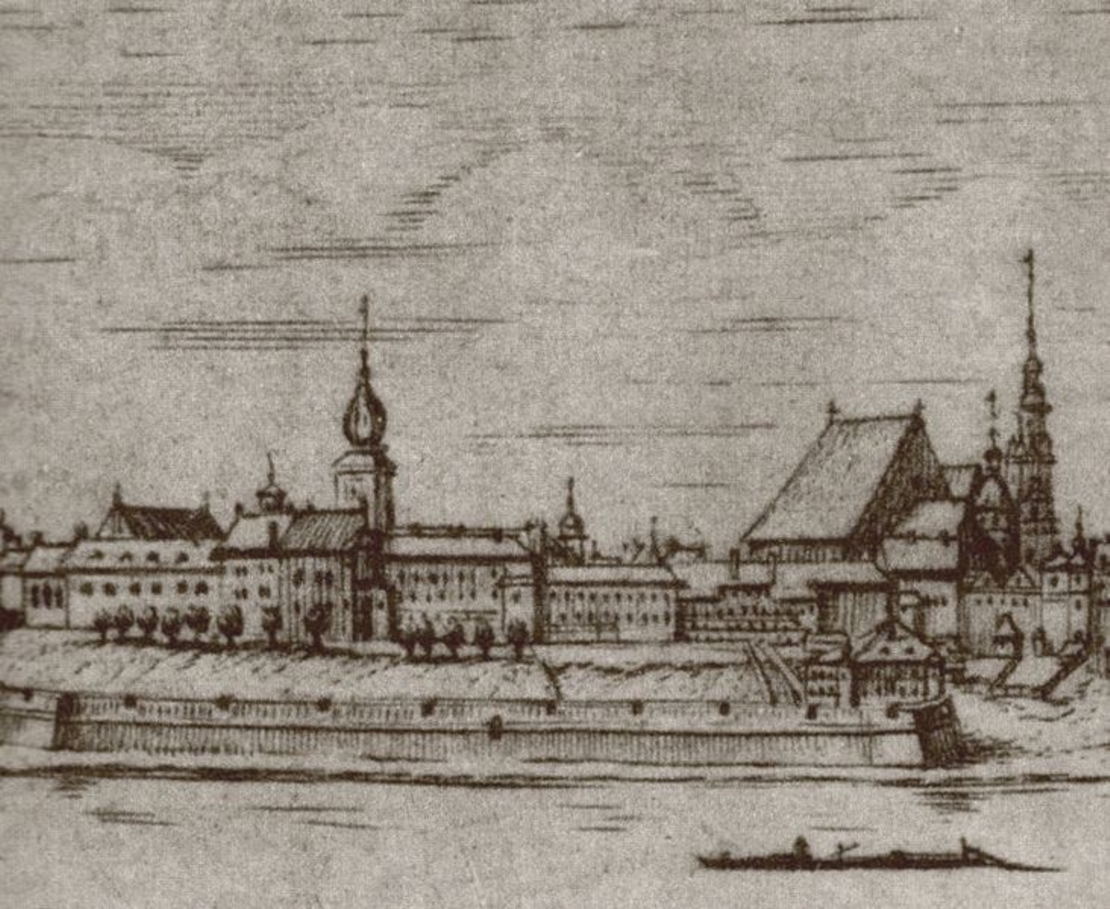
1641

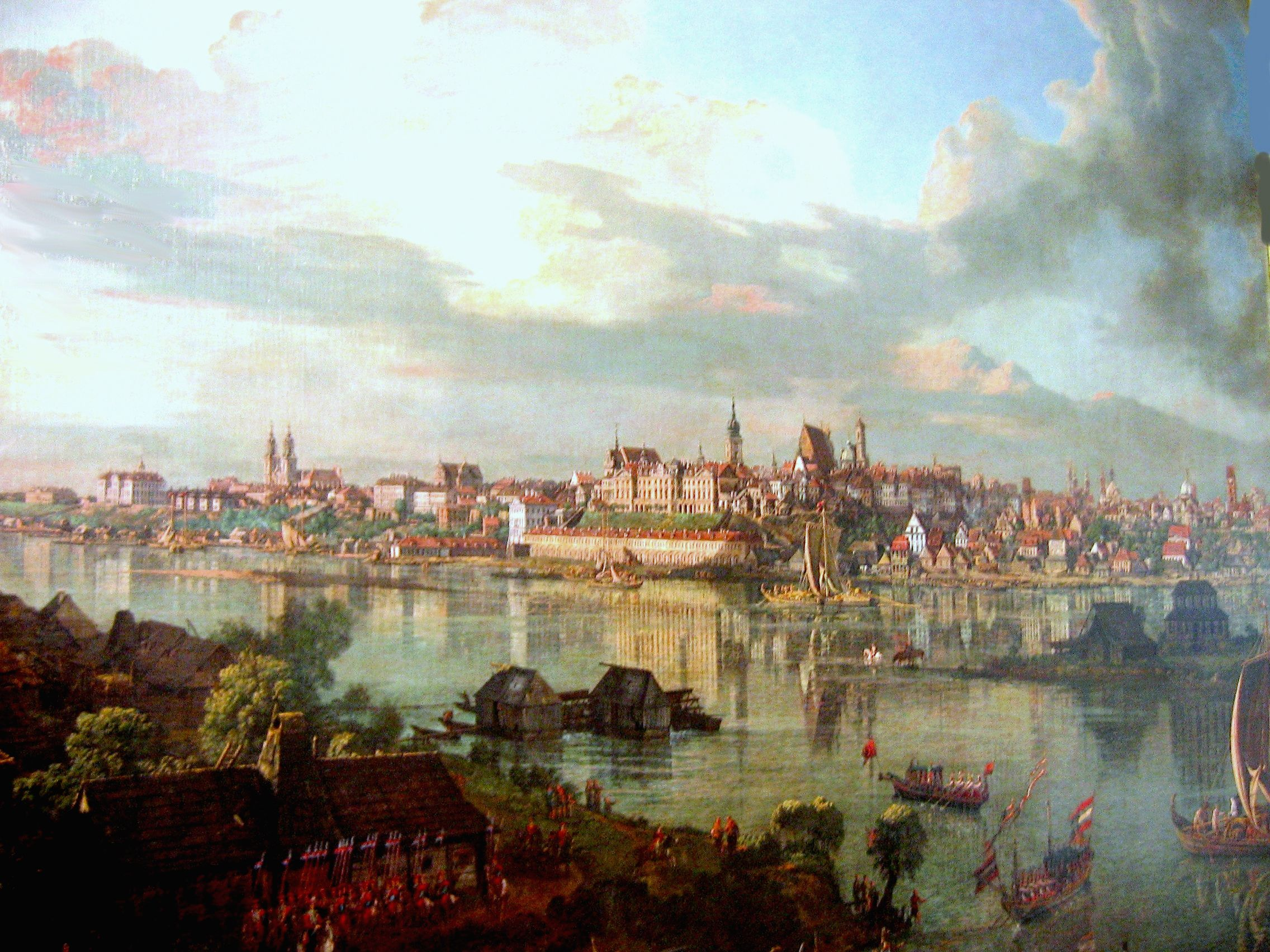
1770

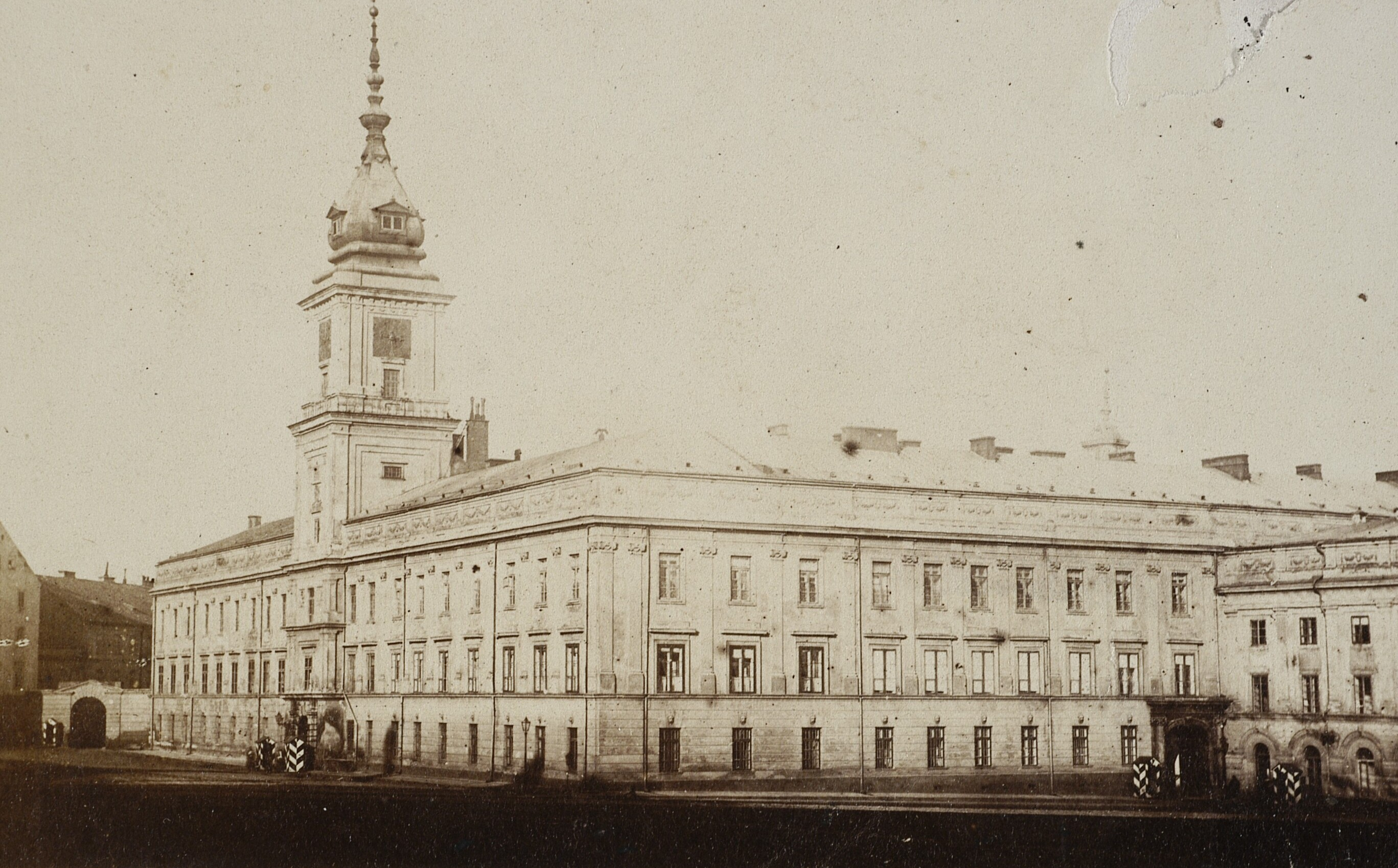
1860

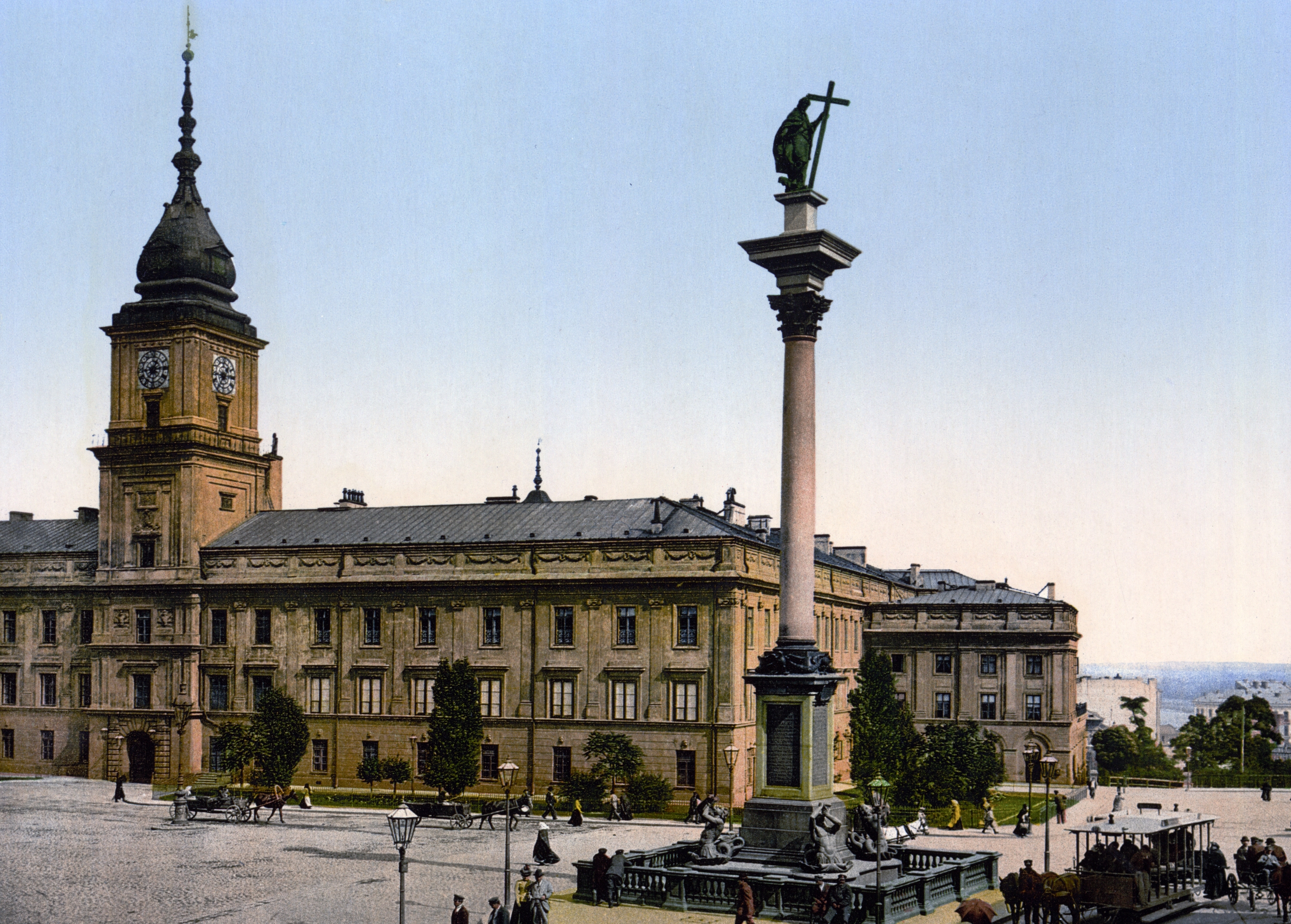
1900

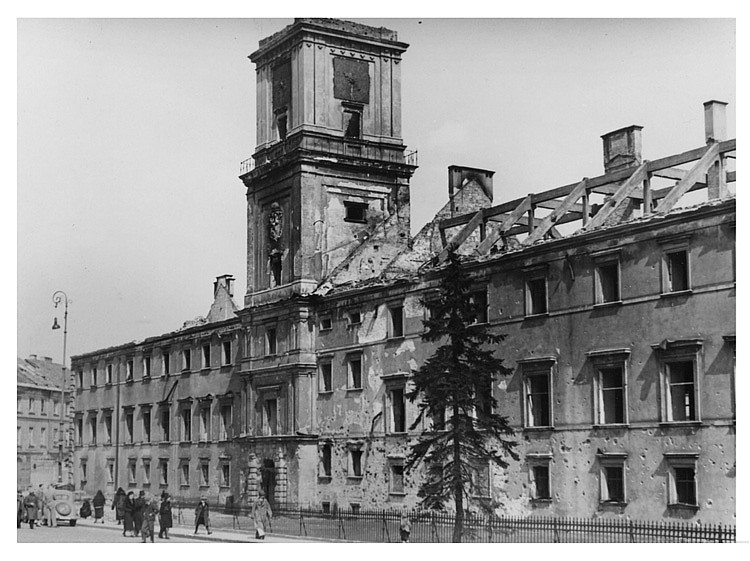
1940

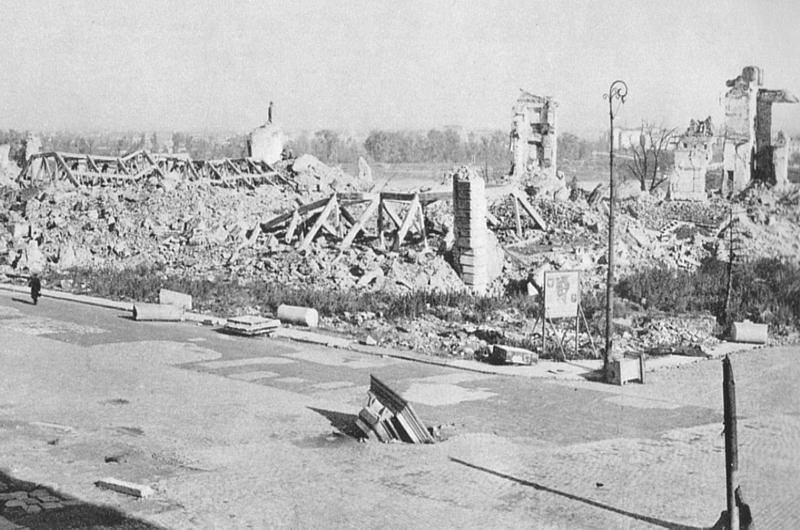
1945
