= Copper-Roof Palace =

Palace in Poland

Coordinates: 52°14′51″N 21°0′57″E

- Pałac Pod Blachą
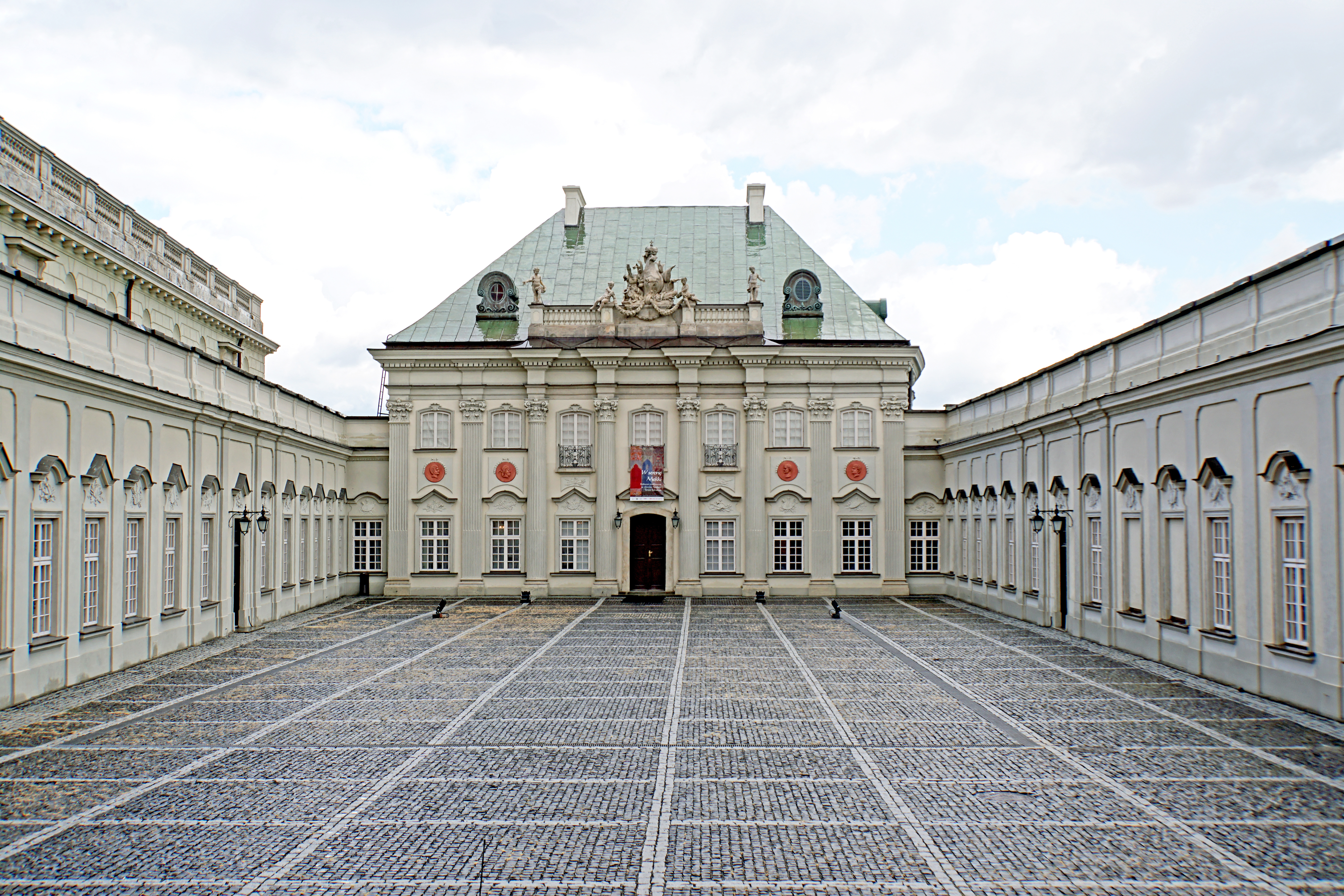
- Copper-Roof Palace
- Interactive map of the Copper-Roof Palace area

General information
- Architectural style: Rococo
- Location: Warsaw, Poland
- Construction started: 1698
- Completed: 1701
- Demolished: 1944
- Client: Jerzy Dominik Lubomirski

Design and construction
- Architect: Jakub Fontana

UNESCO World Heritage Site
- Type: Cultural
- Criteria: ii, vi
- Designated: 1980
- Part of: Historic Centre of Warsaw
- Reference no.: 30bis

Historic Monument of Poland
- Designated: 1994-09-08
- Part of: Warsaw – historic city center with the Royal Route and Wilanów
- Reference no.: M.P. 1994 nr 50 poz. 423

The Copper-Roof Palace (Polish: Pałac Pod Blachą) is an 18th-century palace in Warsaw, Poland. It takes its name (which is less precisely phrased in the original Polish) from the copper roof, a rarity in the first half of the 18th century. Since 1989 the palace has been a branch of the Royal Castle Museum.

The palace is contiguous with Warsaw's Royal Castle, and down a slope from Castle Square and Warsaw's Old Town. Beneath the palace, a 17th-century lodge still exists.

== History ==
The original patrician house of Wawrzyniec Reffus was built in 1651–1656. After its 1657 destruction by the army of George II Rákóczi, it was completely remodeled in 1698–1701 for Jerzy Dominik Lubomirski.

Lubomirski built on a southern wing, perpendicular to the rest of the structure, and expanded the western elevation. Soon after, the palace came to be called Palais Martin after Lubomirski's grandson. In 1720 the palace was rebuilt with the addition of a second, northern wing; and the interior was decorated with rococo paintings.

After 1777 the palace passed into the possession of Poland's last king, Stanisław August Poniatowski (regnal name Stanislaus II Augustus), who hired the architect Domenico Merlini to redesign the rooms and to join the Royal Castle's library wing to it.

The King then presented the redecorated palace to his nephew, Prince Józef Poniatowski. The Prince was a successful commander in the 1794 Kościuszko Uprising, and later one of Napoleon Bonaparte's marshals. Under the Prince's ownership, the palace became a center of Warsaw's high-class social scene.

When Warsaw became part of the Kingdom of Prussia after the Third Partition of Poland (1795), the palace became a Prussian Ministry of War headquarters.

The left wing and the corps de logis (central building) of the Copper-Roof Palace were deliberately burned in 1944 by the occupying German forces during the Second World War. The right wing survived. In 1948–1949 it was reconstructed, based on 18th-century paintings by Bernardo Bellotto.

The palace is now a museum, part of Warsaw's Royal Castle, and hosts a historic library and a permanent exhibit of oriental rugs.

== Gallery ==
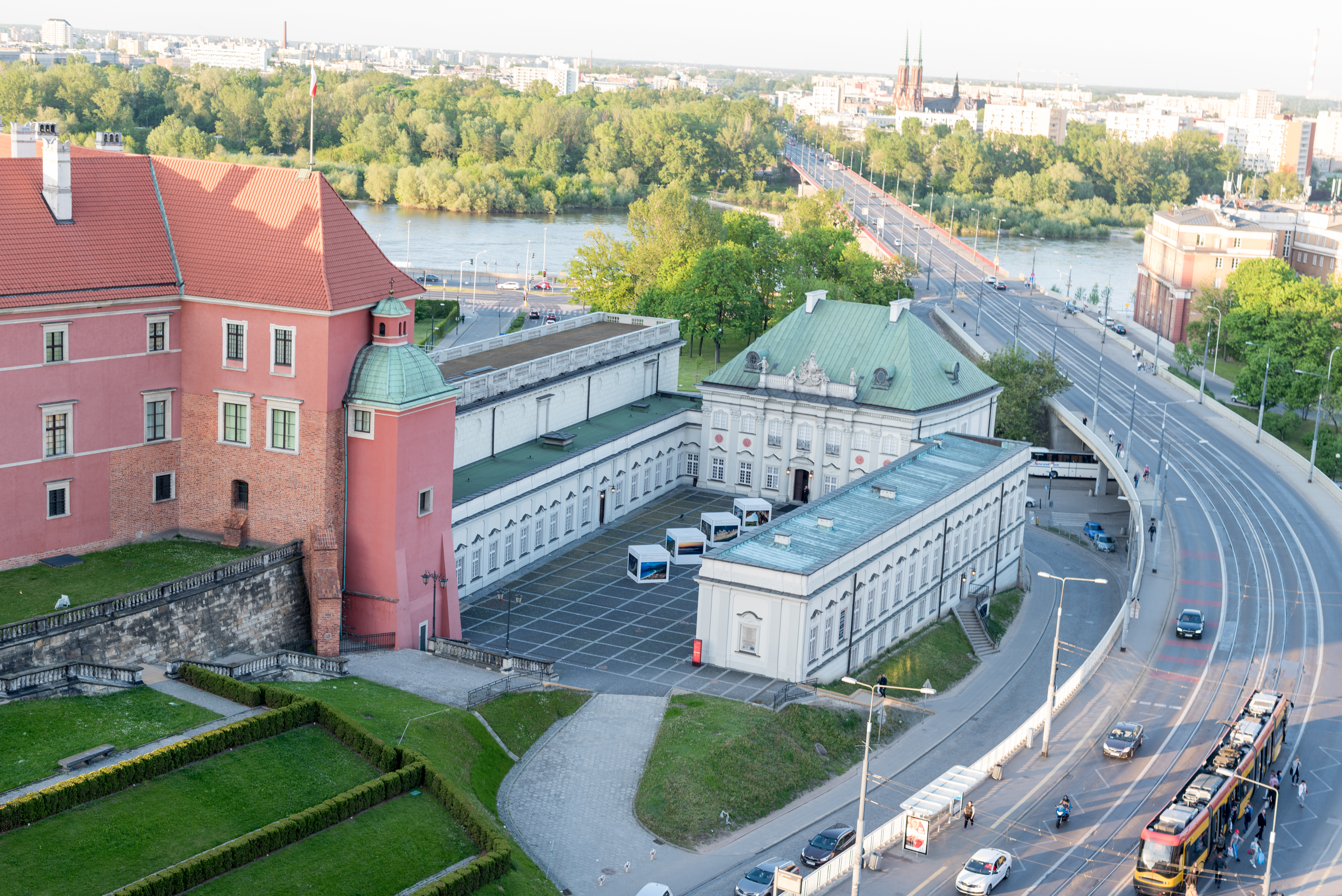
Aerial view

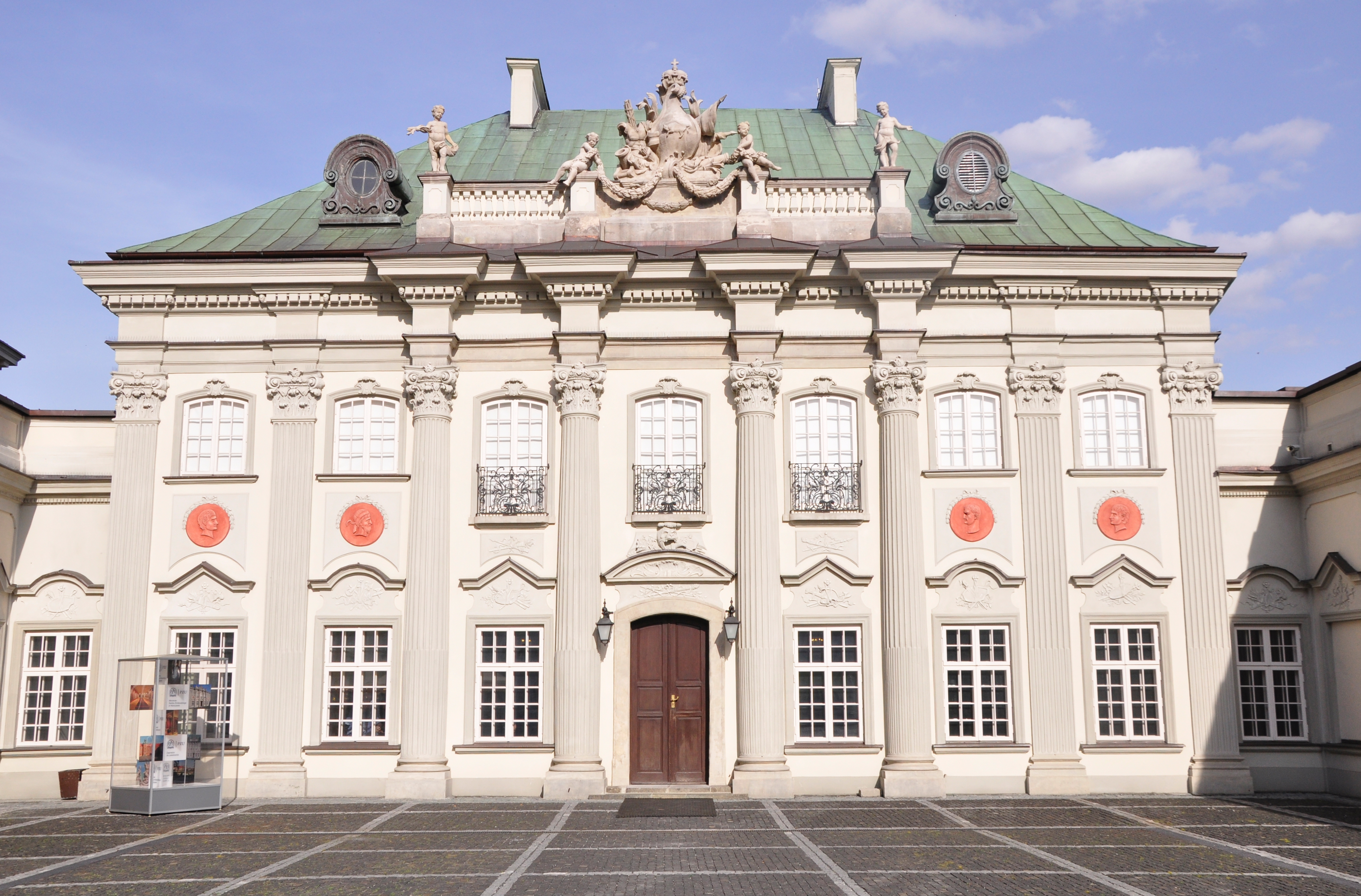
Front view

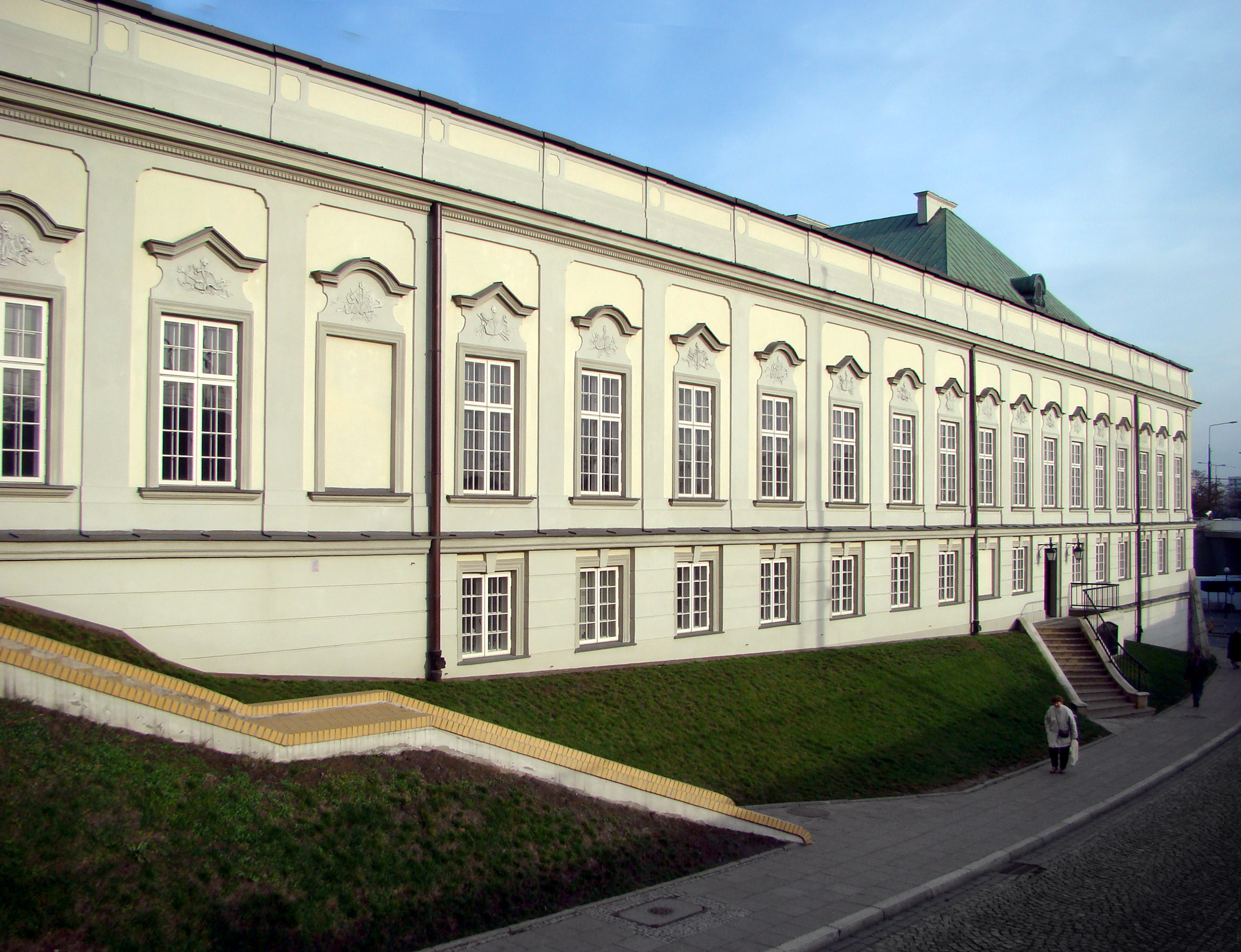
Southern (right) façade

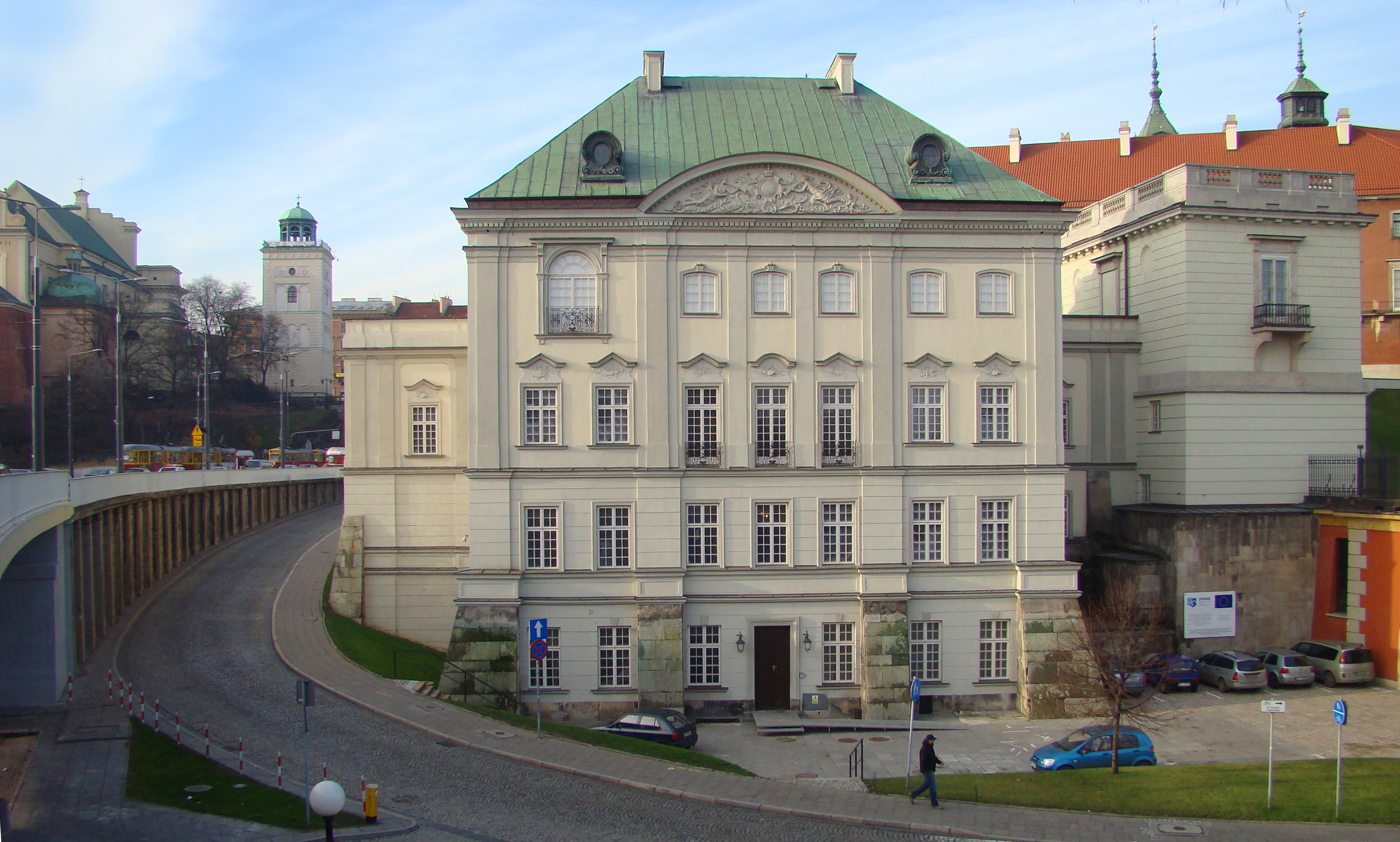
Eastern façade, St. Anne's Church on the left, Royal Castle on the right

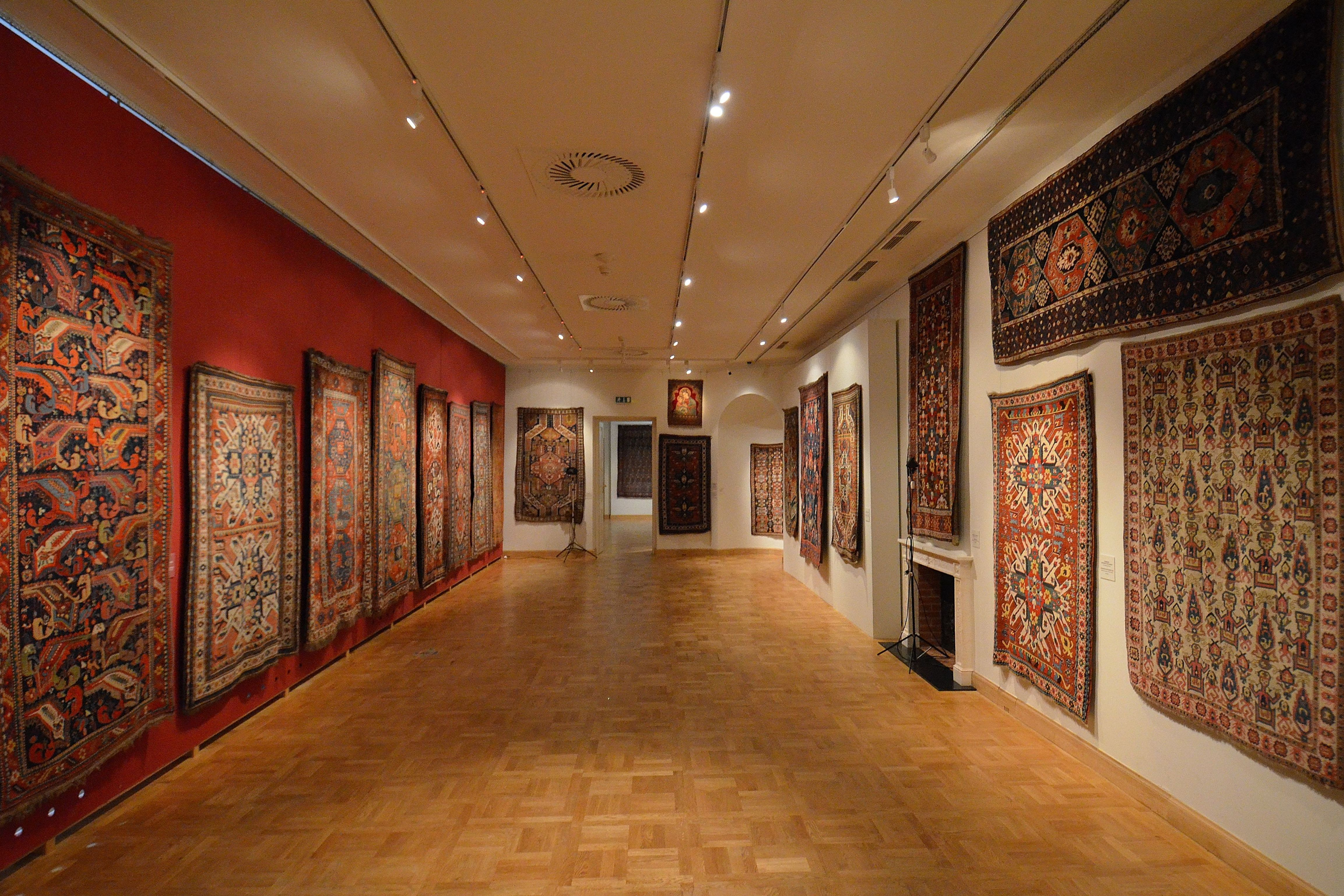
Exhibition of oriental rugs

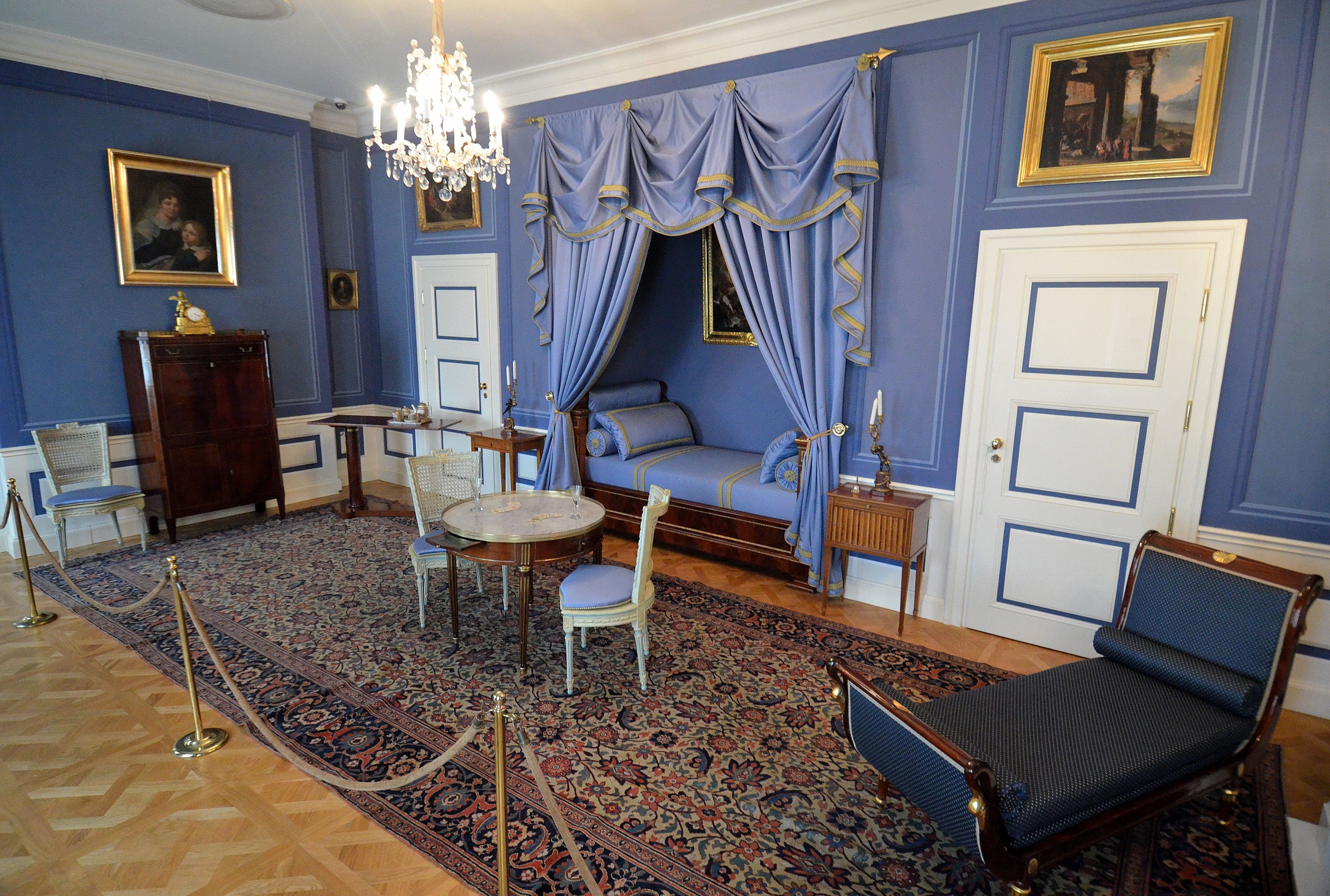
Prince Józef Poniatowski's bedroom

== See also ==
- History of the Royal Castle in Warsaw
- Library at the Royal Castle, Warsaw
