= Royal Library, Warsaw =

Historic library building in Warsaw

Coordinates: 52°14′51″N 21°0′57″E

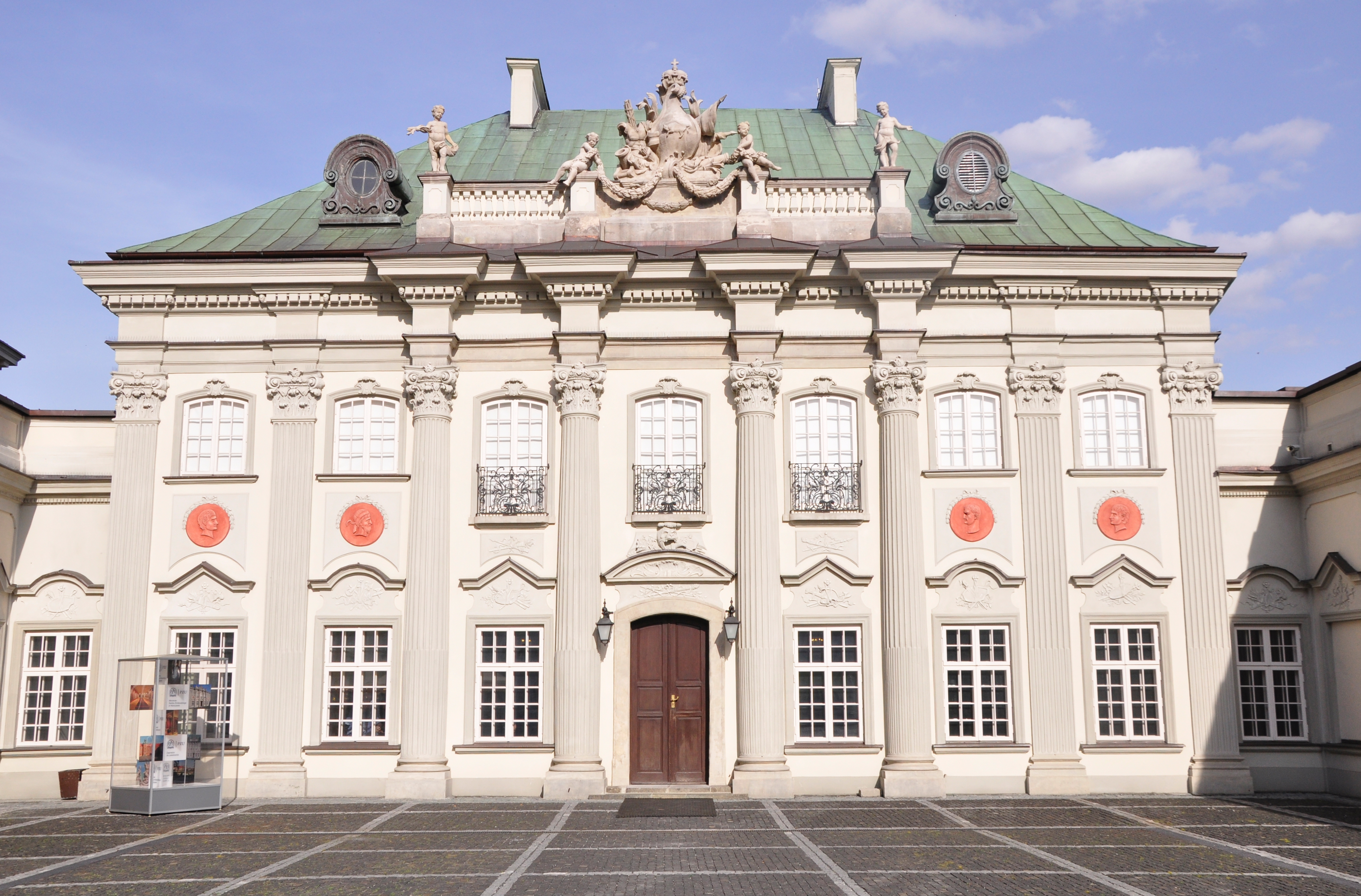
Royal Library at the Copper-Roof Palace in Warsaw

The Royal Library in Warsaw (Polish: Biblioteka Królewska w Warszawie) is a prominent building located adjacent to the Royal Castle in Warsaw, Poland. Constructed between 1779 and 1783, the library was designed by architects Dominik Merlini and Jan Chrystian Kamsetzer to house the royal book collection of King Stanisław August Poniatowski, the last sovereign King of Poland.

The library is an elongated structure measuring 56 x 9 meters, featuring 15 windows along its entrance hall and a terrace on the roof. Initially, the library housed approximately 7,500 items, which expanded to around 20,000 volumes by 1795. Following King Stanisław's death in 1798, the entire collection was acquired by Tadeusz Czacki, who later bequeathed it to the Liceum Krzemienieckie. After the 1830 November Uprising against the Russian occupation, Tsar Nicholas I of Russia ordered the library's relocation to Kiev, where it became the foundation of the new University Library.

== The library holdings ==
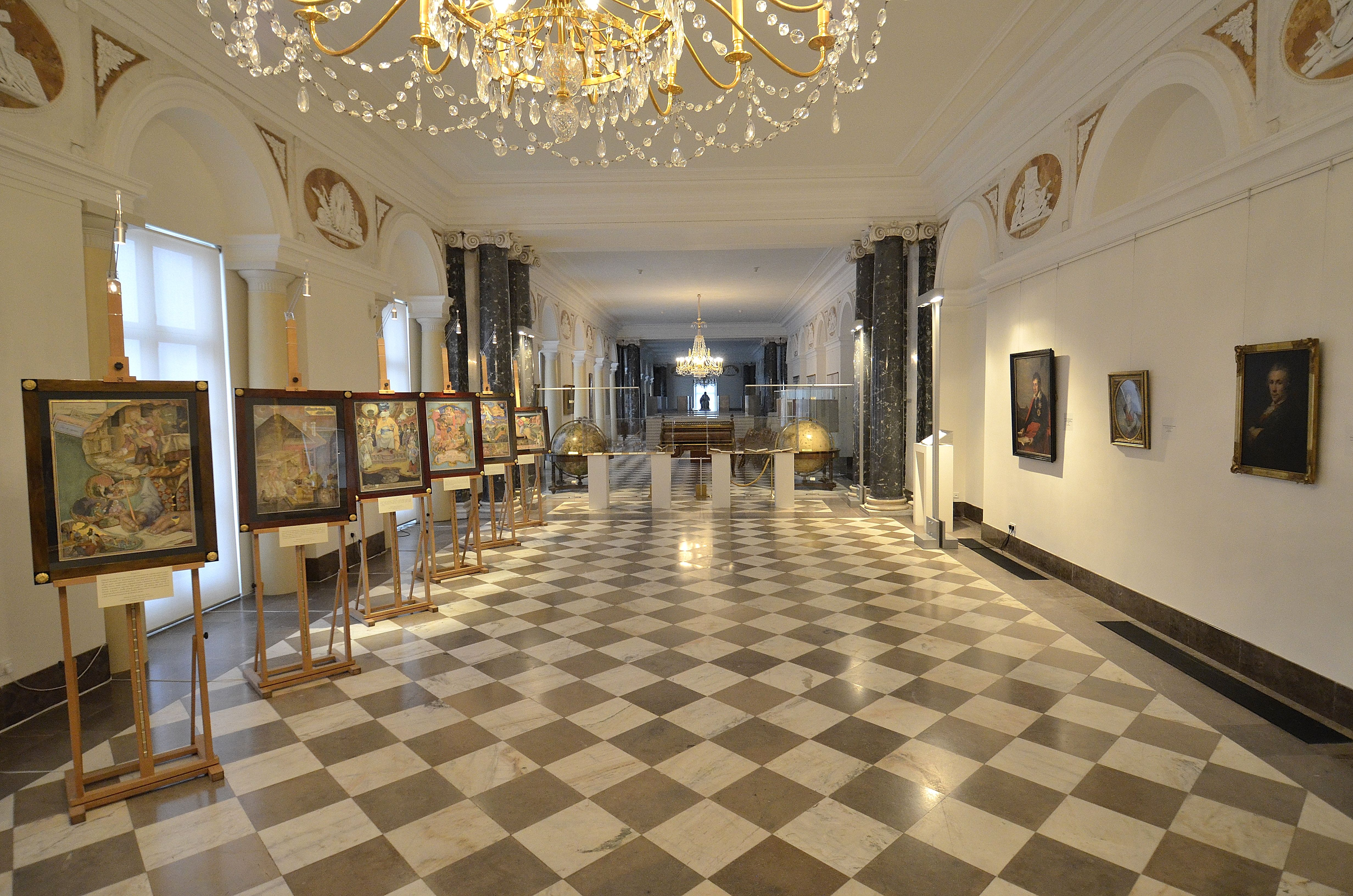
Interior view of the library

The establishment of the library at the palace was driven by King Stanislaus Augustus's commitment to supporting Polish intellectuals and fostering workshops for scientists to develop political and economic reforms. The library acquired books from various collectors, including the private libraries of Giuliani, Jan Beniamin Steinhauser, Mateusz Czarnek, Paweł Czempiński, and Kajetan Ghigiotti. Key suppliers included Warsaw booksellers such as Piotr Dufour, Jan August Poser, Józef Lex, Michał Groell, and the Kornów company from Wrocław, along with international sources like the Paris warehouse of Saint Len and Jan Franciszek Sellon, and selected British booksellers. The King actively directed these acquisitions and awarded the "Merentibus" gold medal to suppliers for their contributions.

The library's collections were categorized into various departments. The Philosophy department featured works by ancient philosophers like Socrates, Plato, Seneca, and Lucretius; modern thinkers such as Erasmus, Francis Bacon, Michael Montaigne; mathematicians like Blaise Pascal, and Descartes; and French Enlightenment philosophers and Encyclopedists including Jean le Rond d'Alembert, Voltaire, and Jean-Jacques Rousseau. The Fiction department included classics such as Homer's Iliad and Odyssey, Comedies of Aristophanes, Ovid's Metamorphoses, Lodovico Ariosto's Mad Orlando, Le Cid by Pierre Corneille, Don Quixote by Miguel de Cervantes, Robinson Crusoe by Daniel Defoe, and the Complete Works of William Shakespeare, in 10 volumes; along with the Collected works of Nicholas Boileau, in 5 volumes.

The library complex was severely damaged by the Nazis during World War II. By 1945, the library building had lost its roof, which was later reconstructed. It is the only structure in the complex that survived the war with its original architectural decorations from the era of King Stanisław August intact. During the communist era until 1989, the complex served as government offices and archives. Following the collapse of the Soviet Union, the palace and library were transformed into a museum, now part of the Warsaw Royal Castle. The buildings underwent further restoration from 2004 to 2008, and today, the library's spacious rooms are used for conventions and exhibitions.

== See also ==
- Załuski Library
- National Library of Poland
- Jagiellonian Library
- Ossolineum
